= Topical antifungal =

Medication for treating fungal infections

Topical antifungal drugs are used to treat fungal infections on the skin, scalp, nails, vagina or inside the mouth. These medications come as creams, gels, lotions, ointments, powders, shampoos, tinctures and sprays. Most antifungal drugs induce fungal cell death by destroying the cell wall of the fungus. These drugs inhibit the production of ergosterol, which is a fundamental component of the fungal cell membrane and wall.

Antifungal drugs are generally classified according to their chemical structures and their corresponding mechanism of actions. The four classes of topical antifungal drugs are azole antifungals, polyene antifungals, allylamine antifungals, and other antifungals.

Azole antifungals inhibit the enzyme that converts lanosterol into ergosterol. Common examples of azole antifungals include clotrimazole, econazole, ketoconazole, miconazole, and tioconazole.

The only polyene antifungal available topically is nystatin, which works by binding to ergosterol thus disrupting the integrity of the fungal cell membrane.

Similar to azoles, allylamines disrupt the fungal cell wall synthesis through inhibition of the squalene epoxidase enzyme that converts squalene into ergosterol. Examples of allylamines antifungals comprise amorolfin, naftifine and terbinafine.

The last group consists of antifungal drugs with a different mechanism of action than the other three classes. These drugs include benzoxaborole antifungals, ciclopirox olamine antifungals, thiocarbamate antifungals and undecylenic alkanolamide antifungals.

Topical antifungal drugs may come with side effects such as itching and local irritation. They can also interact with food and different medications. Therefore, topical antifungals should be used with caution and with advice from medical professionals.

== General mechanisms ==
The chemical structure of ergosterol.

The general mechanism of action for topical antifungal drugs is the disruption of the cell membrane. The unique components found in fungal cell membranes are usually the drug targets of antifungal drugs, in particular ergosterol. It is a sterol, which is important in maintaining proper membrane fluidity and normal functions of the cell membrane. Ergosterol replaces cholesterol found in the cell membranes of mammalian cells. Antifungal medications that target ergosterol synthesis are selectively toxic to the fungi, hence, killing and stopping the growth of fungi in the body. When ergosterol is damaged, it causes the contents inside the fungal cells to leak out, preventing further reproduction of fungal cells. Lastly, antifungal agents contribute to fungal cell death.

Fungal infections are commonly caused by dermatophytes, yeasts or molds. Yeasts are normal inhabitants of our skin but sometimes they grow unheeded which can result in symptomatic infections. Molds are uncommon causes of fungal infections but they can lead to tinea nigra (painless brown or black patches on the skin) or hard-to-treat nail infections. Common examples of fungal infections include Pityriasis capitis (Dandruff). Oral candidiasis (oral thrush), onychomycosis (nail infection), tinea pedis (athlete's foot), Pityriasis Versicolor, tinea capitis, tinea corporis (ringworm), tinea cruris (jock itch) and tinea manuum. Most antifungal agents treat both dermatophyte and yeast infections. However, some, such as nystatin, are not suitable for dermatophyte fungal infections. Therefore, different types of antifungals can selectively remove fungal pathogens from the host with minimum toxicity.

Topical antifungals are generally safe to use in adults, seniors and children, Different dosages may be required for patients of different age groups. Discuss with healthcare professionals before the use of topical antifungal agents.

== General precautions ==
Prior to using topical antifungals, wash the affected area with soap and water and dry it completely, Wash both hands thoroughly after applying topical preparations. Apply a thin layer of topical antifungals to the area of infection. Avoid using occlusive dressings or wrappings unless otherwise directed by a clinician.

Topical antifungal medications usually come with side effects. Some patients may develop itching or local irritations after the application of these products. Consult a pharmacist or clinician if the treated area shows signs of increased irritation or possible sensitization such as erythema, pruritus, burning, blistering, swelling, or oozing. These drugs can also interact with food and various medications. Inform pharmacists or clinicians of existing or contemplated concomitant therapy, including prescription and over-the-counter drugs, dietary or herbal supplements and any concomitant illnesses. Therefore, topical antifungals should be used with caution after seeking advice from medical professionals.

== Classes of antifungals ==
=== Azole antifungals ===
Azole antifungals are generally divided into two groups, imidazoles and triazoles. Common examples of imidazoles include clotrimazole, econazole, miconazole, ketoconazole, while fluconazole, itraconazole, posaconazole and voriconazole fall under the triazole group. Both groups cause substantial damage in fungal membrane integrity by lowering ergosterol levels, along with the loss of cytoplasmic components, thus bringing similar effects to the polyene antifungals.

==== Mechanism of action ====
Azole antifungal drugs exert their effects by inhibiting the synthesis of the sterol components of the fungal membrane. Azoles are predominantly fungistatic, which inhibit the growth of the fungus instead of killing it. These drugs target the ergosterol biosynthetic pathway by inhibiting the C-14 α-demethylase, a cytochrome P450 enzyme, thus preventing the demethylation of lanosterol to ergosterol which is an essential component of the fungal cell membrane. The impaired synthesis of ergosterol leads to a cascade of membrane defects. Hence, fungal cell growth is inhibited due to the disrupted structure and function of the membrane.

==== Clinical use ====
Most topically used azole antifungals belong to the imidazole group; listed below are some of the most common azole antifungals according to the British National Formulary.

- Clotrimazole
  Clotrimazole is widely used to treat fungal infections on different parts of the body, including infections in the otitis externa (ear), the skin, regions of the vagina, and vulva. It is available in the form of pessaries, liquid, creams, and spray. Common side effects of clotrimazole are skin irritations, itchiness or redness in areas where the drug is applied.
- Econazole
  Econazole in the form of creams and nail lacquers is often used to treat fungal skin and nail infections respectively. It can also be used to treat vaginal and vulval candidiasis by administering creams or pessaries vaginally. Some patients may experience skin reactions such as itchiness and redness after application.

Patients with acute porphyrias should avoid using Miconazole and Ketoconazole.

- Miconazole
  Miconazole is a widely used topical antifungal medication for the treatment of many fungal infections, namely skin infections, nail infections and vaginal candidiasis. The drug is usually formulated in creams, powders and sprays. However, it is suggested that patients developing acute porphyrias should avoid using this drug. Miconazole can also be used for both prevention and treatment of oral candidiasis which the drug is formulated as oromucosal gel. It is suggested that the usage of miconazole for oral lesions in infants with swallowing reflexes should be avoided.
- Ketoconazole
  Ketoconazole is majorly used topically to treat fungal skin infections such as tinea pedis (Athlete's foot), seborrhoeic dermatitis, dandruff, and pityriasis versicolor. It can also be used to prevent the recurrence of fungal infections. The drug comes in the form of creams, shampoos, and tablets. Other than treating the infection, ketoconazole may cause skin reactions at the site of application, including skin rash and itching. Ketoconazole is contraindicated in patients with acute porphyrias, where patients may present with shortness of breath and seizures. If not treated promptly, acute porphyrias can be life-threatening.
  In July 2013, the European Medicines Agency's Committee on Medicinal Products for Human Use (CHMP) advised that oral medicines containing ketoconazole should be suspended due to the high risk of hepatotoxicity outweighing its benefits. The advice does not affect topical ketoconazole products, and the oral use of the drug for Cushing's syndrome.

==== Cautions ====
Avoid contact with eyes and mucous membranes using topically. Avoid intravaginal preparations (particularly those that require the use of an applicator) in young girls who are not sexually active, unless there is no alternative (in children).

=== Polyene antifungals ===
Polyene antifungals do not work well orally, so they are mostly seen as a solution or given topically or intravenously as a systemic antifungal. They are not suitable for dermatophyte fungal infections.

==== Mechanism of action ====
Polyene antifungals have high affinity for ergosterol in fungal cell membranes. Upon binding to the fungal cell membrane and forming pores, membrane permeability and transport in fungus are altered. As a result, fungal cell death occurs. Nystatin is the only polyene antifungal that is available for topical administration. The drug is derived from Streptomyces noursei and has activity against Candida but not dermatophytes.

==== Clinical use ====
Nystatin is used topically for the treatment of Candida infections of the skin and mucous membranes.

- Oral candidiasis (oral thrush)
  Nystatin is commonly used in treatment of lesions of the mouth caused by oral candidiasis. The drug can be formulated in pastilles or suspensions and is directly applied to the affected area. After application, patients should avoid taking food or drink for an hour to allow sufficient time for the drug to exert its effect locally. Oral irritation or sensitisation may occur in some patients after applying the drug to the oral mucous membrane.
- Fungal skin infections
  Nystatin in the forms of creams, ointments or powders can also be used to treat fungal infections of the skin. The medication is directly applied to the affected area at around the same times on a daily basis. Some patients may experience itchiness, pain or burning sensations in the area where the drug is applied, while some may develop rashes or hives. On rare occasions, patients may have difficulty breathing or swallowing after topical use of Nystatin.
- Vaginal infections
  Nystatin is also used to treat fungal infections in the vaginal area. It is commonly formulated into pessaries or vaginal cream for application. Ointments, gels, creams or dusting powder may be used when patients develop cutaneous lesions. Skin irritations may occur in some patients after applying the medication vaginally.

Patients who are concurrently using latex contraceptives should be reminded that some intravaginal preparations of nystatin may damage the contraceptive. Additional contraceptive measures may be needed during the treatment duration.

=== Allylamine antifungals ===
==== Mechanism of action ====
Allylamines are a new type of antifungal drug that is highly selective for the fungal enzyme but has a minimal effect on humans. They work in a similar way as azoles but have their effects earlier on in the ergosterol synthesis pathway. Allylamines allow the active ingredients in the medication to accumulate well within the stratum corneum of the skin and nails to exert their actions. They inhibit the enzyme squalene epoxidase which converts squalene into ergosterol. This inhibition results in decreased amounts of sterols, causing cell death and the disruption of the fungal cell wall synthesis. They are known to be quite effective against dermatophytes, yeast, and molds.

==== Clinical use ====
Common allylamine antifungals are naftifine and terbinafine. They are usually used topically for the treatment of skin infections.

- Naftifine
  Naftifine is used topically for the treatment of dermatophytosis, including tinea cruris (jock itch), tinea corporis (ringworm of the body), tinea pedis (athlete's foot) and tinea manuum (ringworm of the hand). It is available in creams or gels. Occlusive dressings should be avoided after applying the topical preparations. Clinical improvement usually occurs within the first week of treatment with Naftifine. Topical preparations containing Naftifine are contraindicated in patients hypersensitive to the drug or any ingredient in the formulation. The major adverse effects of Naftifine are local irritation, skin dryness and rash.
- Terbinafine
  Terbinafine is used to treat skin infections caused by a fungus (yeast), including tinea corporis (ringworm of the body), tinea cruris (jock itch), onychomycosis, Pityriasis Versicolor and tinea pedis (athlete's foot). It is available in gel, spray and cream. These topical preparations should not be administered intravaginally and applied in or near the mouth or eyes. In addition, they should not be used on nails or scalp directly. Topical preparations containing terbinafine are contraindicated in patients hypersensitive to the drug or any ingredient in the formulation. The major adverse effects of Terbinafine are transient burning and stinging, local irritation and rash.

=== Benzoxaborole antifungals ===
==== Mechanism of action ====
Benzoxaborole antifungals are a newer class of antifungal medication. They work by blocking the ability of the fungus to produce proteins in a highly specific way, hence disrupting the action of yeast cytoplasmic enzymes involved in the translation process. A common example of this class of antifungal is Tavaborole.

==== Clinical use ====
- Onychomycosis
  Benzoxaborole antifungal is for the treatment of onychomycosis of toenails. It is applied to the affected toenail once daily for 48 weeks. The major adverse effects associated with its use is the ingrowing of toenails and application site reactions including exfoliation, erythema, and dermatitis.

=== Ciclopirox olamine ===
==== Mechanism of action ====
Ciclopirox and ciclopirox olamine are synthetic antifungal agents. The exact mechanism of action of Ciclopirox olamine antifungals is not well understood. It appears that the medication works by causing depletion of important substrates such as amino acids and/or ions within fungal cells, resulting in the inhibition of transport of these substances across fungal cell membranes. Finally, it disrupts the synthesis of DNA, RNA and proteins in fungal cells and leads to cell death. Ciclopirox may also exert its antimycotic effects by altering fungal cell permeability. However, the leakage of cellular constituents resulting from the decreased cell permeability is only apparent at high drug concentrations.

==== Clinical use ====
Ciclopirox olamine comes in different formulations, which can be used topically in a wide variety of fungal infections.

- Fungal skin infections
  Ciclopirox olamine cream or lotion is used to treat certain dermatophytosis such as tinea pedis, tinea cruris, and tinea corporis. They can also be used for the treatment of cutaneous candidiasis and pityriasis versicolor. The medication is sometimes formulated into gels when treating tinea corporis and interdigital tinea pedis.
- Scalp infections
  Ciclopirox olamine gels and shampoos are used topically to treat seborrheic dermatitis of the scalp.
- Nail infections
  Nail lacquers are formulated from ciclopirox olamine solutions to treat mild to moderate onychomycosis of fingernails and toenails without the involvement of the lunula (the white area at the base of a nail).

==== Adverse effects ====
In general, ciclopirox and ciclopirox olamine preparations are well tolerated by patients when used topically for treatment of fungal infections. Pain, itchiness and burning sensations may occur following topical application of the medication. For patients using ciclopirox nail lacquers, redness of the skin around the nail and the proximal nail fold may occur, while a few of them develop nail disorders such as ingrown nails, changes in shape, and discoloration.

The above adverse reactions are usually mild and self-terminating. They are rarely severe enough to require discontinuation of the drug.

=== Thiocarbamate antifungals ===
==== Mechanism of action ====
Thiocarbamate antifungals have a similar mechanism of action as allylamine antifungals. They both inhibit the enzyme squalene-epoxidase, which converts squalene to lanosterol, the raw material for producing ergosterol in fungal cells. By blocking the sterol synthesis in fungal cells and cell extracts, the integrity of fungal cell membranes will be interrupted, thus leading to impeded fungal growth.

==== Clinical use ====
Tolnaftate is one example of thiocarbamate antifungals.

- Tolnaftate
  Tolnaftate is a topically used antifungal for treating or preventing superficial dermatophyte infections, also known as skin infections, ringworm or tinea, and pityriasis versicolor. It is available in gel, solution, powder, ointment, or cream. Repeated treatment may be required if conditions do not improve within two to six weeks. Tolnaftate is effective in inhibiting the growth of dermatophytes such as Epidermphyton and Microsporum, but the drug has no use against candida or bacteria infections. Contraindications include nail or scalp infections, and sulfa allergy or hypersensitivity to tolnaftate itself. Tolnaftate is usually useful for patients desiring self-medication of mild tinea infections.

==== Adverse effects ====
Side effects are rare with tolnaftate and may include irritation, burning, pruritus (itchiness), and contact dermatitis.

=== Undecylenic alkanolamide antifungals ===
==== Mechanism of action ====
Undecyclenic alkanolamide antifungals, also referred to as undecylenic acid and undecenoic acid, is a type of unsaturated fatty acid that inhibits fungal growth on the skin.

==== Clinical use ====
Although undecylenic acids possess antifungal properties, the drug itself is seldom used on its own for antifungal purposes. Salts of undecylenic acid such as zinc undecenoate and calcium undecenoate are commonly formulated into antifungal creams, ointments, solutions or powders. Undecenoic acid and its salt forms are applied topically to treat superficial dermatophytosis, in particular tinea corporis (ringworm), tinea pedis (athlete's foot), and tinea cruris (jock itch). Undecenoic acid is also formulated into several other salts and derivatives such as methyl, phenyl and propyl undecenoate, which are also used to treat fungal infections on the skin. There has been limited evidence showing the effectiveness of undecylenic acid in treating nail and scalp fungal infections.

==== Adverse effects ====
Irritation may occur in some patients after topical application of undecylenic acid or its salts and derivatives.
