= Two feet-one hand syndrome =

Long-term fungal medical condition

- Specialty: Dermatology, infectious diseases
- Symptoms: Diffuse scaling of palms and prominent palmar creases in one hand, tinea pedis in both feet
- Complications: Secondary bacterial infection
- Duration: Tendency to last longterm
- Causes: Trichophyton rubrum
- Risk factors: Excessive sweating
- Diagnostic method: Visualization, microscopy, culture
- Differential diagnosis: Dermatitis, psoriasis, keratoderma, hyperkeratosis, allergic contact dermatitis
- Prevention: Foot hygiene, avoid scratching feet and toes
- Treatment: Antifungals
- Medication: Oral terbinafine, itraconazole, fluconazole, griseofulvin
- Frequency: Males>females

Two feet-one hand syndrome (TFOHS) is a long-term fungal condition in which athlete's foot or fungal toenail infections in both feet is associated with tinea manuum in one hand. Often the feet are affected for several years before a diffuse scaling rash on the palm of one hand appears, at which point some affected people may decide to seek medical help.

The most common causative organism is Trichophyton rubrum. The condition is more likely to occur in people who sweat more. Diagnosis is by visualization, microscopy and culture. It may appear similar to dermatitis, psoriasis, keratoderma, hyperkeratosis and allergic contact dermatitis. Treatment is with long-term systemic antifungals, typically oral terbinafine or itraconazole.

The condition is frequently seen in skin clinics. Males are affected more frequently than females. One study showed that 65% of cases with tinea manuum were part of TFOHS. TFOHS was first described by Curtis in 1964.

== Signs and symptoms ==
TFOHS is a long-term fungal condition where athlete's foot or fungal toe nail infections in both feet is associated with tinea manuum in one hand. It typically presents with a diffuse scaling rash on the palm of one hand, which is preceded, sometimes by several years, by fungal infection in both feet. Palmar creases appear prominent. There is typically a sharp demarcation at the wrist. Signs in a hand therefore require an examination of feet.

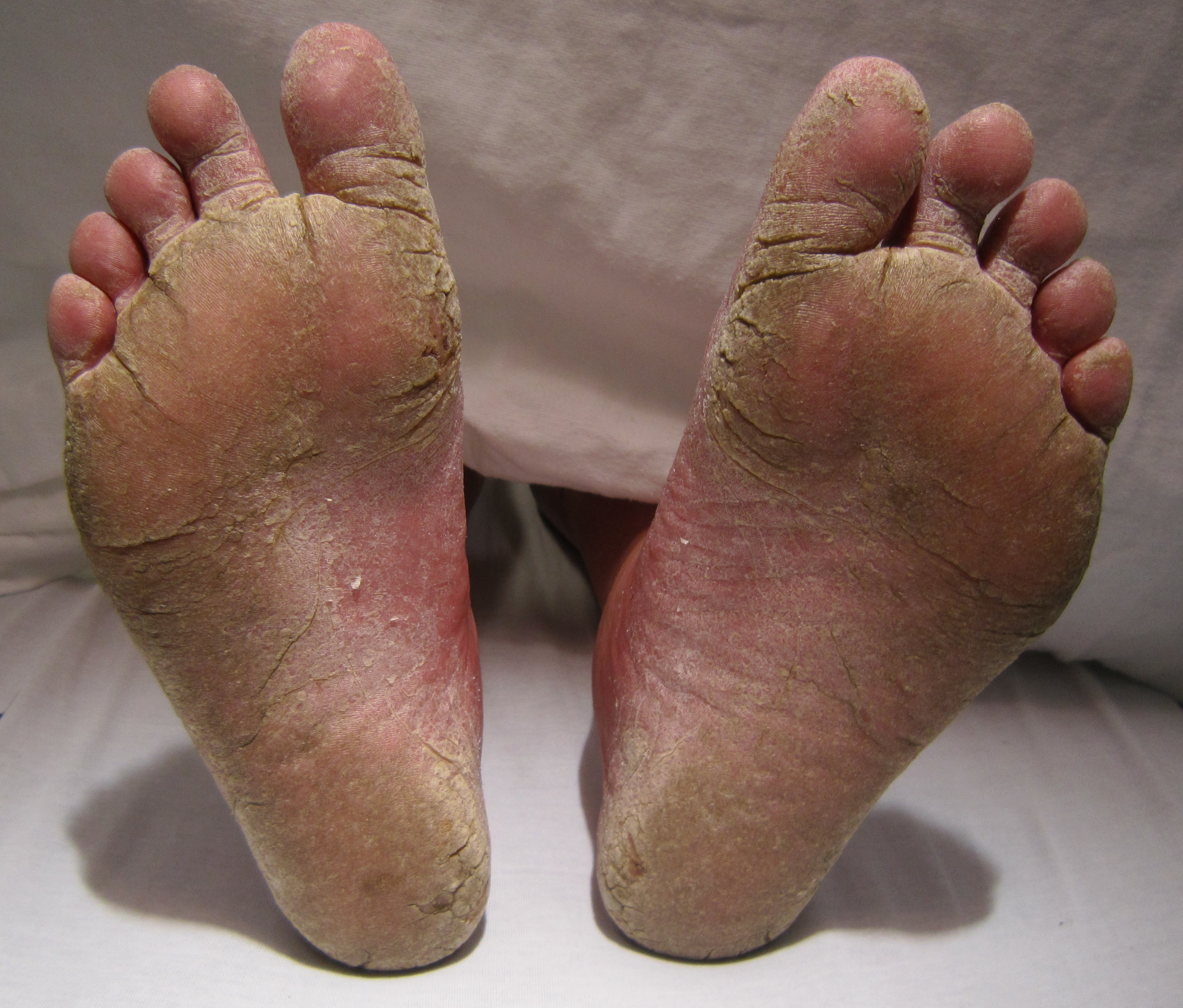
Tinea of feet

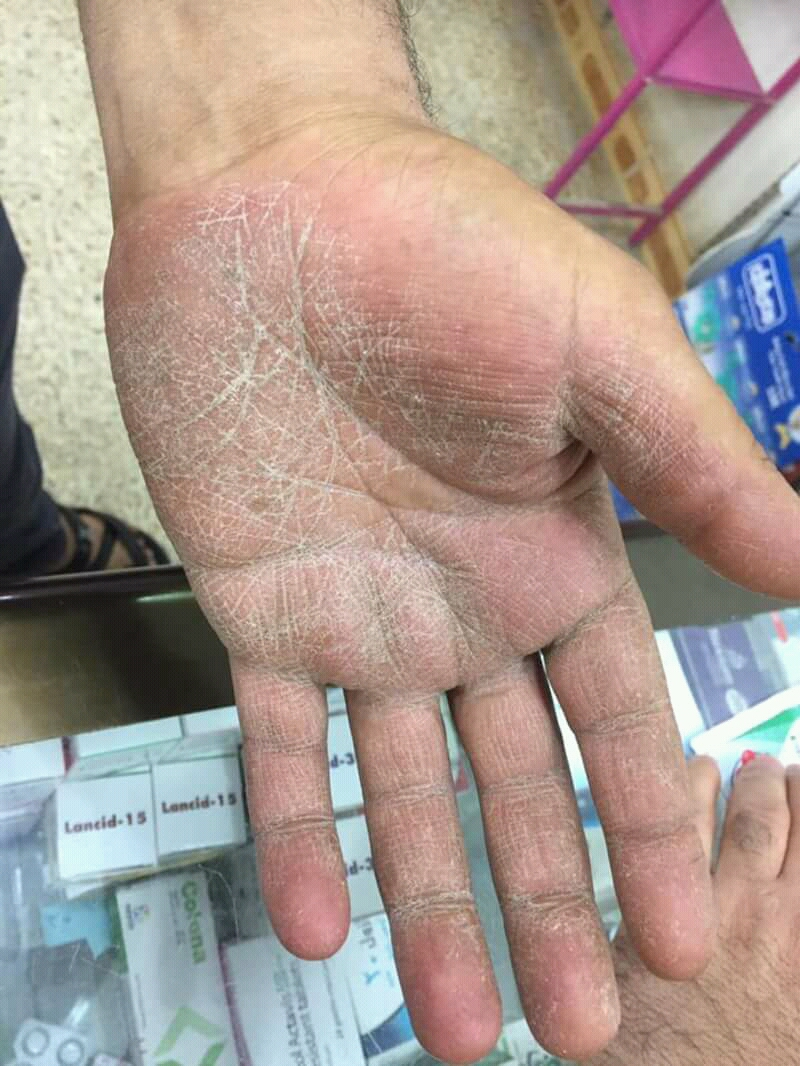
Tinea manuum (one hand)

== Cause ==
TFOHS may follow scratching feet infected by fungi or occur after a pedicure. The most common causative organism is Trichophyton rubrum. Typically, the hand that is used to scratch the infected feet or toes is the one that contracts tinea manuum. Why the other hand is spared is not clear. In a case-control study that also looked at scratching habits, despite concluding that it was likely that tinea manuum develops in the hand that scratches the feet, some cases of TFOHS occurred in the hand that did not scratch the feet.

Risk factors are the same as for athlete's foot and include excessive sweating and weakened immune system. Reinfection from contaminated socks may be possible.

== Diagnosis ==
Diagnosis of TFOHS is by visualisation, microscopy and culture from skin scrapings of the edge of the rash. The condition may appear similar to dermatitis, psoriasis, keratoderma, hyperkeratosis and allergic contact dermatitis. It is sometimes misdiagnosed as hand eczema.

== Treatment ==
Treatment is with long-term systemic antifungals, typically oral terbinafine or itraconazole. Other options include fluconazole and griseofulvin. Prevention is focused on hygiene measures such as keeping feet dry and applying antiseptic powder. Using intermittent antifungal treatment in susceptible people, and avoiding scratching the feet or picking at fungal toenail infections are further preventative measures. Avoiding washing socks in cold water may help, as well as dusting feet with Tolnaftate powder. Dusting socks with talc, cornstarch or rice powder may help keep feet dry.

== Epidemiology ==
It is not known how many people have TFOHS. Males are affected more frequently than females. Athlete's foot is the most common fungal disease, with possibly more than 50% of the population affected at some time. Tinea manuum accounts for less than 2% of all superficial fungal infections. Tinea manuum is rare in both hands. Scenarios with one foot and two hands, and one foot and one hand, have been described. One study showed that 65% of cases with tinea manuum were part of TFOHS.

== History ==
The condition was first described by Curtis in 1964. It was later designated a syndrome.
