= Econazole/triamcinolone =

Combination drug

Combination of
- Econazole: antifungal
- Triamcinolone: corticosteroid

Clinical data
- Trade names: Econazine

Identifiers
- CAS Number: 78371-62-7

Econazole/triamcinolone is a combination drug, consisting of econazole (an imidazole antifungal) and triamcinolone (a group III topical steroid).

It is used as a topical cream against fungal skin infections, including Trichophyton mentagrophytes, T. rubrum, Epidermophyton floccosum and Candida albicans.
