= Hydrocortisone/miconazole =

Combination drug

Combination of
- Hydrocortisone: Topical steroid
- Miconazole: Antifungal

Clinical data
- Trade names: Daktacort, Daktodor, Cortimyk, Brentacort

Identifiers
- CAS Number: 1365550-54-4

Hydrocortisone/miconazole is a combination drug, often consisting of 1% hydrocortisone (a topical steroid) with 2% miconazole (an antifungal). Hydrocortisone/miconazole is sold as Daktacort in the UK and Sweden, Daktodor in Greece, Cortimyk in Sweden and Brentacort in Denmark.
