= DDAIP =

Chemical compound

Clinical data
- Other names: Dodecyl 2-N,N-dimethylaminopropionate; Dodecyl-2-(dimethylamino)propionate; N,N-Dimethylalanine dodecyl ester

Pharmacokinetic data
- Bioavailability: <1% (topical)
- Protein binding: >99%
- Metabolism: Esterase mediated
- Elimination half-life: 5 hours
- Excretion: Urinary

Identifiers
- IUPAC name: 2-Dimethylaminopropionic acid dodecyl ester (Decyl (C10) ester shown)
- CAS Number: 149196-89-4
- PubChem CID: 3025823
- ChemSpider: 2291478
- UNII: 6679UF28DO
- CompTox Dashboard (EPA): DTXSID70933573

Chemical and physical data
- Formula: C_{17}H_{36}ClNO_{2}
- Molar mass: 321.93 g·mol^{−1}
- 3D model (JSmol): Interactive image
- SMILES: CCCCCCCCCCCCOC(=O)C(C)N(C)C
- InChI: InChI=1S/C17H35NO2/c1-5-6-7-8-9-10-11-12-13-14-15-20-17(19)16(2)18(3)4/h16H,5-15H2,1-4H3; Key:HSMMSDWNEJLVRY-UHFFFAOYSA-N

DDAIP is a pharmaceutical ingredient added to topical products to increase penetration through the skin. Chemically, DDAIP is an ester of N,N-dimethylalanine and dodecanol, although as of now the structural formula shows an ester with decanol (C10) instead. DDAIP is typically formulated as its hydrochloride salt (DDAIP.HCl). This salt is a white crystalline solid with a melting range of 88-93 °C and is an amphiphilic molecule with a pKa of 4.87 that is soluble in water up to about 40% w/v. DDAIP is proprietary to NexMed USA, a subsidiary of Apricus Biosciences.

== Mechanism of action ==
DDAIP is a permeation enhancer that temporarily changes the permeation dynamics of the lipid bilayer and opens up the tight junctions between skin cells so active drug molecules can be rapidly absorbed through the skin into systemic circulation. It can also improve the solubility of compounds resulting in enhanced drug permeation.

== Clinical use ==
DDAIP hydrochloride is a functional inactive excipient currently used in the topical drug Vitaros, an alprostadil vasodilator cream used to treat erectile dysfunction. It is also used in MycoVa, a terbinafine antifungal nail lacquer for onychomycosis currently in phase-III clinical trials.

== Safety ==
Overall, about 5,000 patients have been exposed to this compound with no serious adverse events recorded. DDAIP is primarily metabolized by esterases on cell surfaces and plasma to N,N-dimethylalanine, which is further demethylated to alanine; and dodecanol which is oxidized to lauric acid, both naturally occurring compounds already present in the body.
