= Squalene monooxygenase =

Mammalian protein found in Homo sapiens

SQLE

Identifiers
- Aliases: SQLE, entrez:6713, squalene epoxidase
- External IDs: OMIM: 602019; MGI: 109296; GeneCards: SQLE
Enzyme activity
EC #	BRENDA	ExPASy	KEGG	MetaCyc
1.14.14.17	↗	↗	↗	↗

Gene location (Human)
Chr.	Chromosome 8 (human)
Band	8q24.13	Start	124,998,497 bp
Band	8q24.13	End	125,022,283 bp

Gene location (Mouse)
Chr.	Chromosome 15 (mouse)
Band	15|15 D1	Start	59,186,926 bp
Band	15|15 D1	End	59,203,041 bp
RNA expression pattern
Bgee	Human / Mouse (ortholog); Top expressed in: ventricular zone; ganglionic eminence; gingival epithelium; bronchial epithelial cell; cartilage tissue; nipple; C1 segment; inferior ganglion of vagus nerve; tibia; human penis / Top expressed in: genital tubercle; hair follicle; ciliary body; corneal stroma; trigeminal ganglion; iris; choroid plexus of fourth ventricle; lip; ventricular zone; anterior horn of spinal cord; More reference expression data
BioGPS	n/a
Gene ontology
Molecular function	oxidoreductase activity; flavin adenine dinucleotide binding; squalene monooxygenase activity; FAD binding
Cellular component	organelle membrane; integral component of membrane; endoplasmic reticulum membrane; membrane; intracellular membrane-bounded organelle; endoplasmic reticulum
Biological process	cellular aromatic compound metabolic process; cholesterol biosynthetic process; response to organic substance; cholesterol metabolic process; sterol biosynthetic process; regulation of cholesterol biosynthetic process
Sources:Amigo / QuickGO
Orthologs
Databases	NCBI: entry; OMA: entry
Species	Human	Mouse
Entrez	6713	20775
Ensembl	ENSG00000104549	ENSMUSG00000022351
UniProt	Q14534	P52019
RefSeq (mRNA)	NM_003129	NM_009270
RefSeq (protein)	NP_003120	NP_033296
Location (UCSC)	Chr 8: 125 – 125.02 Mb	Chr 15: 59.19 – 59.2 Mb
PubMed search
- Wikidata
View/Edit Human	View/Edit Mouse

Squalene monooxygenase (also called squalene epoxidase) is a eukaryotic enzyme that uses NADPH and diatomic oxygen to oxidize squalene to 2,3-oxidosqualene (squalene epoxide). Squalene epoxidase catalyzes the first oxygenation step in sterol biosynthesis and is thought to be one of the rate-limiting enzymes in this pathway. In humans, squalene epoxidase is encoded by the SQLE gene. Several eukaryote genomes lack a squalene monooxygenase encoding gene, but instead encode an alternative squalene epoxidase that performs the same task.

== Mechanism ==
The canonical squalene monooxygenase is a flavoprotein monooxygenase. Flavoprotein monooxygenase form flavin hydroperoxides at the enzyme active site, which then transfer the terminal oxygen atom of the hydroperoxide to the substrate. Squalene monooxygenase differs from other flavin monooxygenases in that the oxygen is inserted into the substrate as an epoxide rather than as a hydroxyl group. This enzyme contains a loosely bound FAD flavin and obtains electrons from NADPH-cytochrome P450 reductase, rather than binding NADPH directly. The alternative squalene epoxidase belongs to the fatty acid hydroxylase superfamily and obtains electrons from cytochrome b5.

== Known crystal structures ==
Researchers identified crystal structures of squalene epoxidase in the human genome. One crystal structure was found on the domain that binds the inhibitor Cmpd-4 with a FAD cofactor at 2.30Å. The other crystal structure is found on the domain that binds another inhibitor, NB-598, with FAD at 2.50Å. In its unliganded, apo form (3.0 Å), squalene epoxidase displays greater displacement of the substrate-binding site compared to the liganded domains that bind with the FAD cofactor. This encloses polar residues, preventing binding to the tertiary amine of an inhibitor, and significantly reduces squalene epoxidase's catalytic activity in converting squalene to 2,3-oxidosqualene Although this enzyme is present in baker's yeast(Saccharomyces cerevisiae) and other mammals, no genes encoding specific crystal structures have been discovered.

== Active sites ==
There is only one active site located in the catalytic domain of squalene epoxidase. In the active site, the FAD-binding domain consists of a three-layer ββα sandwich structure also known as the GR2 Rossmann foldWithin the FAD-binding domain, FAD-binding motifs, including G-Box, GD- and DG-motifs, are present, which is typical of flavin epoxidases. The GD motif is critical for recognizing the NADPH cofactor that supplies the necessary electrons for the oxidation reaction. The substrate-binding site consists of a two-layer βα sandwich domain with a seven-stranded β-sheet structure, followed by two helices at the C-terminus.

== Squalene epoxidase's role in sharks ==
In addition to humans and baker's yeast, squalene epoxidase is present in all species of sharks. Shark livers typically consist of 40-60% squalene, with some deep-sea species' liver, like the smallfin gulper shark(Centrophorus moluccensis), containing 93% squalene. Due to a lack of a swim bladder and a negatively buoyant body structure, oil content in shark livers is the main control for a shark's positive buoyancy in the water column. Squalene epoxidase is used to maintain squalene levels in order to achieve neutral buoyancy while swimming in the marine environment.

== Inhibitors ==
Inhibitors of squalene epoxidase have found application mainly as antifungal drugs:

- butenafine
- naftifine
- terbinafine

Since squalene epoxidase is on the biosynthetic pathway leading to production of cholesterol, inhibitors of this enzyme may also find application in treatment of hypercholesterolemia.

== Localization ==
In baker's yeast, squalene epoxidase is localized to both the endoplasmic reticulum and lipid droplets. Only the ER localized protein is active.

== Additional products ==
Squalene epoxidase also catalyzes the formation of diepoxysqualene (DOS). DOS is converted to 24(S),25-epoxylanosterol by lanosterol synthase.

== See also ==
- Antifungal drug#Allylamines
