= Polyallylamine hydrochloride =

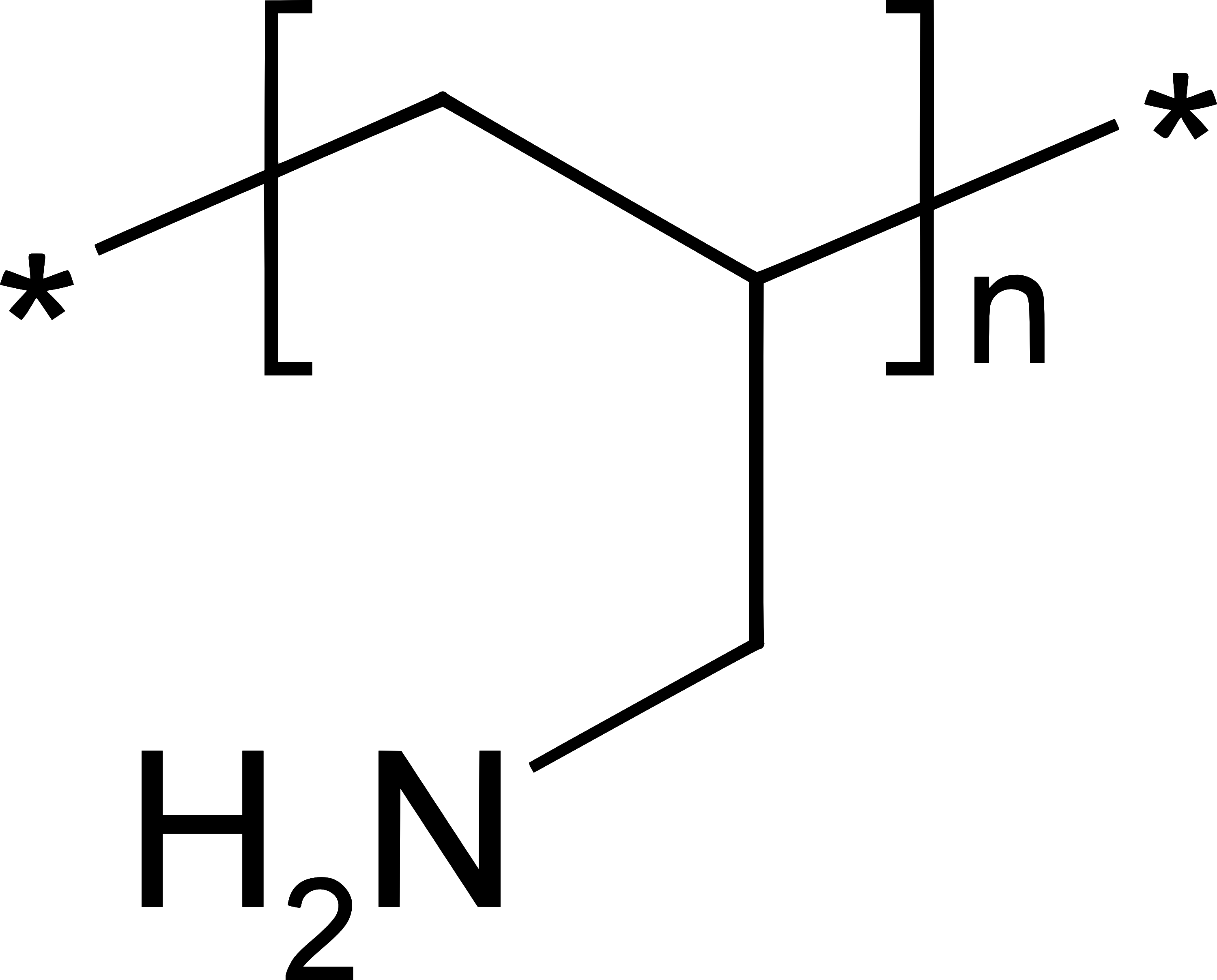
Polyallylamine structure

Polyallylamine hydrochloride (CAS No. 71550-12-4) is a cationic polyelectrolyte prepared by the polymerization of allylamine. It can be used in combination with an anionic polyelectrolyte like poly(sodium styrene sulfonate) to form a layer-by-layer adsorbed film of negatively and positively charged polymers.

Poly(allylamine hydrochloride) has many biomedical applications. The most prominent use of this polyelectrolyte is in the field of cell encapsulation. A layer by layer method is used by alternating positively and negatively charged polyelectrolytes to build a barrier between the cell and the harsher outside environment. Upon cell lysis, the capsule of layered polyelectrolytes maintains its structural integrity and can be used for purposes such as drug delivery.
