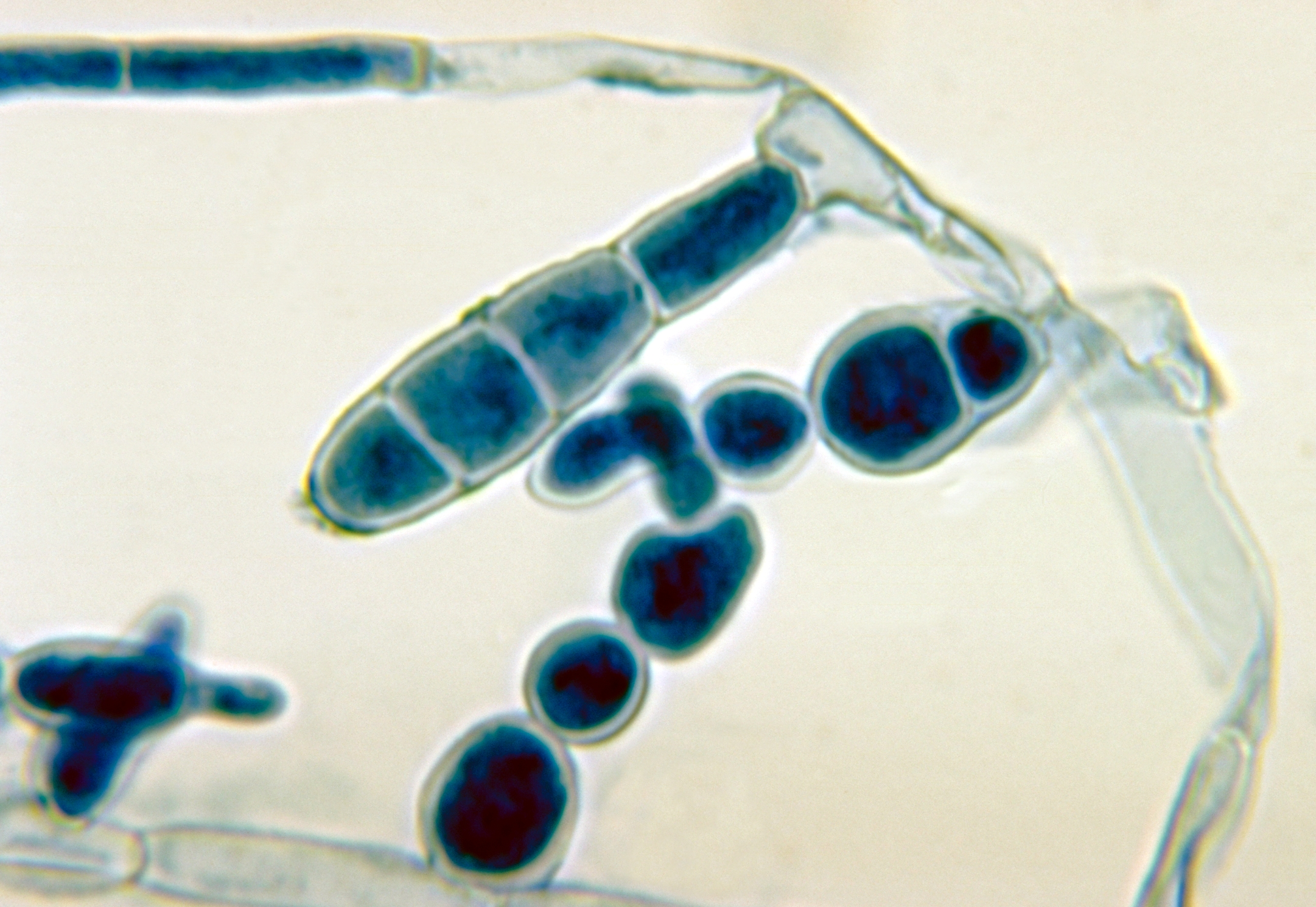
- Epidermophyton floccosum

Scientific classification
- Kingdom: Fungi
- Division: Ascomycota
- Class: Eurotiomycetes
- Order: Onygenales
- Family: Arthrodermataceae
- Genus: Epidermophyton; Sabour.

Species
- see text

= Epidermophyton =

Genus of fungi

Epidermophyton is a genus of fungus causing superficial and cutaneous mycoses, including E. floccosum, and causes tinea corporis (ringworm), tinea cruris (jock itch), tinea pedis (athlete's foot), and tinea unguium (fungal infection of the nail bed). It contains 14 species

== Species ==
Epidermophyton contains the following species:

- Epidermophyton album Kesteven
- Epidermophyton angustisporum Boedijn
- Epidermophyton cerebriforme C.W. Dodge
- Epidermophyton flavum Kesteven
- Epidermophyton floccosum (Harz) Langeron & Miloš.
- Epidermophyton griseum Kesteven
- Epidermophyton indicum Castell. & Chalm.
- Epidermophyton inguinale Sabour.
- Epidermophyton macrosporicum Kesteven
- Epidermophyton niveum L. MacCarthy
- Epidermophyton planum Kesteven
- Epidermophyton plicarum Nicolau
- Epidermophyton salmoneum Mello
- Epidermophyton variabile Karrenb.
