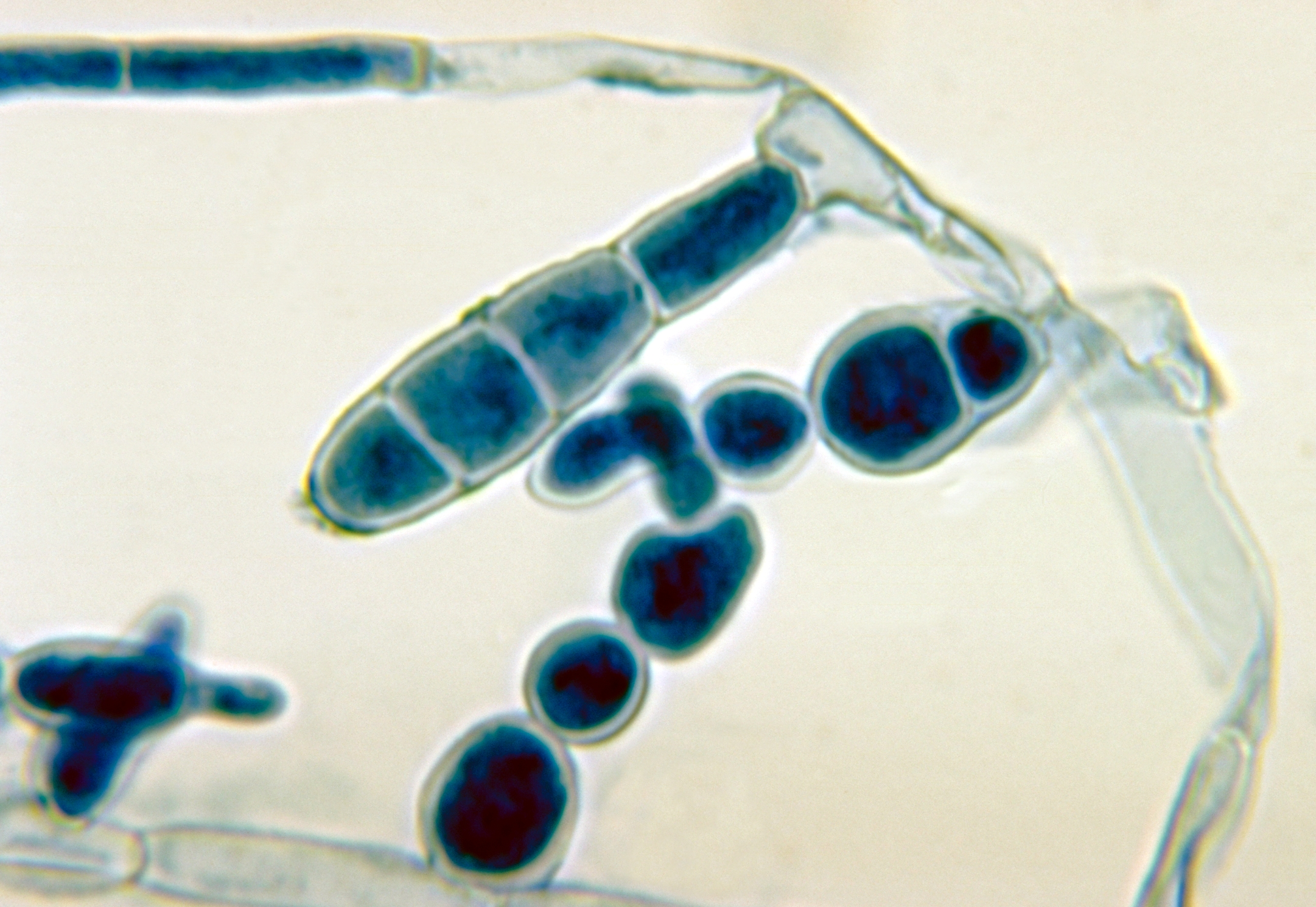

Scientific classification
- Kingdom: Fungi
- Division: Ascomycota
- Class: Eurotiomycetes
- Order: Onygenales
- Family: Arthrodermataceae
- Genus: Epidermophyton
- Species: E. floccosum

Binomial name
- Epidermophyton floccosum (Harz) Langeron & Miloch. (1930)

Synonyms
- Acrothecium floccosum Harz; Blastotrichum floccosum (Harz) Berl. & Voglino; Dactylium floccosum (Harz) Sartory; Epidermophyton pernetti ( Castell.) Nann.; Epidermophyton clypeiforme (MacCarthy) C.W.Dodge

= Epidermophyton floccosum =

Species of fungus

Epidermophyton floccosum is a filamentous fungus that causes skin and nail infections in humans. This anthropophilic dermatophyte can lead to diseases such as tinea pedis (athlete's foot), tinea cruris, tinea corporis and onychomycosis. Diagnostic approaches of the fungal infection include physical examination, culture testing, and molecular detection. Topical antifungal treatment, such as the use of terbinafine, itraconazole, voriconazole, and ketoconazole, is often effective.

E. floccosum is one of two species in the genus Epidermophyton. During the 20th century, this species was the fourth most common cause of dermatophytosis in North America. This ascomycete has a worldwide distribution but is more commonly isolated from patients in tropical and subtropical areas. The non-soil associated fungus has no specific growth conditions and shows characteristic smooth club-shaped macroconidia under the microscope.

== History and taxonomy ==
The fungus was first isolated in 1870 from a tinea cruris patient in Germany by Carl Otto Harz, who named it Acrothecium floccosum. Being unaware of Harz's work, Castellani and Sabouraud identified the species again in 1905 and 1907, respectively, and both placed the fungus into the genus Epidermophyton. Epidermophyton is one of the three dermatophyte fungal genera; it is distinct from the other two genera (Microsporum and Trichophyton) for the absence of microconidia. In 1930, based on the principle of priority, Langeron and Milochevitch renamed the fungus Epidermophyton floccosum to recognize Harz's contribution in identifying the species first, as well as his extensive morphological descriptions.

Another fungus, originally named Epidermophyton stockdaleae, is a dark-brown, soil-inhabiting species that is morphologically and molecularly distinct to E. floccosum for its longer conidia and 7% NaCl tolerance. E. stockdaleae is also clinically differentiated from E. floccosum by its ability in perforating hair. Due to the presence of microconidia, E. stockdaleae is now considered a synonym of Trichophyton ajelloi, hence E. floccosum is currently the only species in the genus Epidermophyton.

== Growth and morphology ==
The filamentous non-soil associated fungus does not require any specific growth condition in culture. E. floccosum does not grow on urease culture, has low osmotolerance, and is unable to form perforating organs. The colonies have khaki suede-like flat surfaces and grow moderately rapidly, reaching maturity within 10 days. The reverse is reddish-brown. Colonies are initially flat, but the centre of which later becomes raised and folded, with the periphery submerged. On rich media like Sabouraud agar, colonies usually degenerate into white pleomorphic tufts within several weeks, and sometimes exude a red-brown pigment into its agar.

E. floccosum has septate, hyaline hyphae. Its key features are the smooth, thin-walled, club-shaped macroconidia and the absence of microconidia. The macroconidia are borne singly or in clusters of 2 or 3; they are 20–40 μm in length and 7–12 μm in width, consisting of 1 to 9 septa. The narrow base and broad, club-shaped apex of the macroconidium have been compared in shape to a beaver tail.

The fungus reproduces asexually through chlamydoconidia, which are resting spores that are abundant in culture. Arthroconidia are also abundant in the culture, emerging as swollen cells alongside macroconidia formation; these thick-walled spores are resistant to heat and drying conditions.

== Pathology ==
=== Infection ===
E. floccosum causes superficial diseases such as tinea pedis (athlete's foot) and tinea cruris, and less commonly tinea corporis and onychomycosis. Similar to other fungal dermatophytes, E. floccosum can invade keratinized tissues including skin and nails. A recent clinical case has also demonstrated its capacity of infecting eyes, causing keratitis. It does not perforate hair or hair follicles. This anthropophilic dermatophyte preferentially infects humans and rarely infects animals, thus lab animal experiments are found to be unsuccessful. E. floccosum is more infective than most dermatophytes. Chronic infections are rare, therefore maintenance of the species relies on rapid transmission between hosts. The infection typically stays within the nonliving conidified layer of host epidermis, since the fungus cannot pierce through living tissues of individuals with normal immunity. However, it has been found to cause invasive infections in immunocompromised patients, demonstrating severe onychomycosis, skin lesions, and subcutaneous nodules.

=== Spread ===
E. floccosum can remain viable for long periods of time by producing arthroconidia in skin scales. Arthroconidia are thick-walled spores with higher resistance to drying and heat conditions than mycelium. Arthroconidia formation allows E. floccosum to survive for years in showers, baths, swimming pools, towels, blankets, sheets, shoes and other clothing. The fungus commonly spreads by contact in showers and gym facilities.

=== Treatment ===
In vitro studies have found that several agents are effective against E. floccosum. Disease-specific topical treatments for E. floccosum-related infections are usually effective, commonly with the use of terbinafine, itraconazole, and ketoconazole.

== Diagnosis ==
When causing the same disease, clinical demonstrations of E. floccosum are generally indistinguishable from other dermatophytes, except for tinea pedis: infections involving E. floccosum can demonstrate marked scaling in patient's toe and sole and produce punctate lesions nearby. Brownish macules could derive from some of these lesions.

Traditionally, diseases are diagnosed with physical and Wood's lamp examinations. Unlike some Microsporium species, Epidermophyton, as well as Trichophyton do not fluoresce under the ultraviolet light of a Wood's lamp. Fungal cultures further distinguish Epidermophyton from other dermatophytes based on the absence of microconidia. Molecular advances have decreased the time of identification from 3–4 weeks to 3–4 days. Samples obtained from patient nail, hair, and skin scale can undergo PCR-RFLP, which distinguishes between 12 dermatophyte species based on their individual restriction enzyme profiles, including one for E. floccosum. A real time PCR protocol is also available for the specific detection of E. floccosum, allowing identification as fast as four hours after sample lysis.

== Habitat ==
E. floccosum has a worldwide distribution but is more commonly found in tropical and subtropical areas. Historical fungal infections have been reported in US military in Vietnam and British Army in Southeast Asia. E. floccosum was considered the fourth most common cause of dermatophytosis in North America. Accounting for around 20 percent of US cases and 44 percent of Asian cases, it is also the third most common cause of tinea pedis worldwide, following Trichophyton mentagrophytes and Trichophyton rubrum.
