= Apricus Biosciences =

Apricus Biosciences, Inc.
- Type: Public
- Traded as: Nasdaq: APRI
- Industry: Biopharmaceutical
- Founded: 1987
- Headquarters: San Diego, California, United States
- Key people: Richard Pascoe (CEO); Brian Dorsey (iSVP & Chief Development Officer); Barbara Troupin, MD, MBA (SVP & Chief Medical Officer)
- Products: Vitaros, Fispemifene, RayVa, Femprox
- Revenue: US$ 7.4 million (First Nine Months 2014)
- Number of employees: 120 (2012)
- Website: www.apricusbio.com

Apricus Biosciences, Inc. is a San Diego–based biopharmaceutical company advancing innovative medicines in urology and rheumatology.

Apricus Biosciences' first product, Vitaros®, has been approved in Europe and Canada for the treatment of erectile dysfunction Other compounds in development include: low testosterone, rheumatology, sexual dysfunction, pain,

== History ==
Until September 10, 2010, when it formally changed its name, Apricus Biosciences, Inc. (Nasdaq: APRI) had been operating in the pharmaceutical industry since 1995 under the name NexMed, Inc. NASDAQ:NEXM. On November 15, 2010, Apricus Bio received Canadian approval for its topical ED treatment Vitaros and it announced European approval on June 10, 2013.

In February 2018, the Food and Drug Administration issued its second denial of permission to sell Vitaros in the United States.

== Location ==
Apricus Biosciences is headquartered in San Diego, California. The company, and its subsidiaries, has approximately 35 employees.

== Products ==
Vitaros® is a rapid-onset (generally 5–15 minutes) topical cream for the treatment of erectile dysfunction. It contains Prostaglandin E1 as the active ingredient and the Company's proprietary permeation enhancer (NexACT®) which facilitates the delivery of the drug into the blood stream. The current formulation of Vitaros requires refrigeration and is delivered via a small individual dispenser. Vitaros has been approved for patient use in Canada and Europe and to date (January 24, 2015) has been launched by marketing partners in the United Kingdom (Takeda), Germany (Sandoz), Sweden (Sandoz) and Belgium (Sandoz). Six additional European territories are expected to launch Vitaros during 2015.

Apricus has developed a room temperature formulation of Vitaros which is housed and delivered in a small, custom developed, disposable dispenser or "room temperature device" (RTD). Initial production of Vitaros RTD has commenced in order to generate the required stability data required for marketing approval. The Company continues to expect its commercial partners to launch the Vitaros RTD in 2016.

In November 2007 Apricus Biosciences sold the rights for the refrigerated formulation of Vitaros in the US to Warner Chilcott.

Fispemifene is a new chemical entity initially being pursued for the treatment of low testosterone (secondary hypogonadism) in males. Apricus plans to begin a Phase 2b clinical trial with fispemifene in this indication in the first half of 2015, with top-line data expected to be reported by the end of 2015. Apricus in-licensed the U.S. rights to fispemifene from Forendo Pharma in Q4 2014. Since then, it has transferred the regulatory filings from Forendo, developed a Phase 2b clinical trial protocol, held a scientific advisory board meeting with experts in the field to refine its development strategy, initiated the manufacturing process for the drug, and begun the clinical trial site selection process.

RayVa™ is a topical cream for the treatment of Raynaud's phenomenon, a circulatory disorder affecting the hands and feet. Patient enrollment commenced in December 2014 for a 45-patient Phase 2a clinical trial for RayVa which is expected to be completed and results announced in the second quarter in 2015. RayVa has the potential to be the only FDA approved treatment for this debilitating condition. RayVA contains Prostaglandin E1 as the active ingredient and Apricus' permeation enhancer (NexACT) which facilitates the delivery of the drug into the blood stream.

Femprox® is a topical cream for the treatment of female sexual interest / arousal disorder. It contains Prostaglandin E1 as the active ingredient and a permeation enhancer (NexACT) which facilitates the delivery of the drug into the blood stream.

== NexACT Technology ==
NexACT® is a proprietary water-soluble small molecule permeation enhancer which temporarily changes the permeation dynamics of the lipid bi-layer and transiently loosens the tight junctions between the cells so that active drug molecules can be rapidly absorbed into systemic circulation. The NexACT technology is used in both Vitaros and RayVA. It can also improve the solubility of compounds resulting in enhanced drug permeation.

== Leadership ==
Richard Pascoe – CEO Mr. Pascoe joined Apricus in March 2013 following the merger of Somaxon Pharmaceuticals with Pernix. At Somaxon Mr. Pascoe was the Chief Executive Officer since August 2008 and was responsible for the FDA approval of Somaxon’s lead drug Silenor®. Prior to Somaxon, Mr. Pascoe was with ARIAD Pharmaceuticals, Inc., a specialty pharmaceutical company where he was most recently Senior Vice President and Chief Operating Officer.

Prior to joining ARIAD in 2005, Mr. Pascoe held a series of senior management roles at King Pharmaceuticals, Inc., a specialty pharmaceutical company, including senior vice president positions in both marketing and sales, as well as vice president positions in both international sales and marketing and hospital sales. Prior to King, Mr. Pascoe was in the commercial groups at Medco Research, Inc. (which was acquired by King), COR Therapeutics, Inc., B. Braun Interventional and The BOC Group. Mr. Pascoe is a member of the board of directors of KemPharm, Inc., Cohera Medical, Inc., and the Corporate Directors Forum (CDF).

Mr. Pascoe served as a Commissioned Officer with the U.S. Army 24th Infantry Division, following his graduation from the United States Military Academy at West Point where he received a B.S degree in Leadership.

Brian Dorsey – SVP, Chief Development Officer Mr. Dorsey has served in the Pharmaceutical and Biotechnology industries for over 20 years where he has provided high-level drug development, regulatory and QC/QA leadership of pharmaceutical candidates from early development to FDA approval. He has held various senior management roles with pharmaceutical companies, most recently at Pernix Therapeutics as Senior Vice President Pharmaceutical Development. Prior to this, Mr. Dorsey held managerial positions of increasing responsibility at Somaxon Pharmaceuticals, Baxter Bioscience and Pfizer Global Research and Development.

Mr. Dorsey received his Master of Science in Executive Leadership and his B.A. in Chemistry from the University of San Diego.

Barbara Troupin, MD, MBA – SVP, Chief Medical Officer Dr. Troupin has held various senior management roles with VIVUS, Inc. in the areas of Medical Affairs and Clinical Development since 2006. In these roles, Dr. Troupin was the clinician lead for the Phase 3 program for Qsymia, as well as the lead contributor for all medical review of the Qsymia New Drug Application and was the lead medical presenter at the successful Qsymia FDA Advisory Committee Meeting. Prior to this, Dr. Troupin held Medical Director positions at the Profil Institute for Clinical Research and Radiant Research, both contract research organizations.

Dr. Troupin received her M.D. from the University of Pennsylvania School of Medicine and her M.B.A. from the Wharton School of Business.
