= Naftifine =

Chemical compound

Clinical data
- Trade names: Exoderil, Naftin
- AHFS/Drugs.com: Monograph
- MedlinePlus: a688020
- ATC code: D01AE22 (WHO)

Identifiers
- IUPAC name: (2E)-N-methyl-N-(1-naphthylmethyl)-3-phenylprop-2-en-1-amine
- CAS Number: 65472-88-0
- PubChem CID: 47641
- DrugBank: DB00735
- ChemSpider: 66071
- UNII: 4FB1TON47A
- ChEBI: CHEBI:7451
- ChEMBL: ChEMBL626
- CompTox Dashboard (EPA): DTXSID6048545

Chemical and physical data
- Formula: C_{21}H_{21}N
- Molar mass: 287.406 g·mol^{−1}

Naftifine hydrochloride (brand names include Exoderil and Naftin) is an allylamine antifungal drug for the topical treatment of tinea pedis, tinea cruris, and tinea corporis (topical fungal infections).

Naftifine was invented at the Sandoz Research Institute in Vienna, Austria. It was the first successful antifungal medication of the allylamine class.

Naftifine has triple action: antifungal, antibacterial, and anti-inflammatory. Its fungistatic activity is believed to be based on inhibition of the squalene-2,3-epoxidase enzyme, which in turn results in the shortage of ergosterol required for the formation of fungal cell membranes. With some fungal species, there is also fungicidal activity from a resulting accumulation of squalenes, leading to damage of the fungal cell membranes, including at the endoplasmatic reticulum. Naftifine shows mostly fungicidal activity toward dermatophytes and molds, and mostly fungistatic activity toward yeasts. It is also effective as an antibacterial agent in treating pyoderma.

Naftifine is almost completely metabolized in the human body, with a half-life of 2–3 days. The metabolites do not have antifungal activity, and are excreted within urine and feces.
