= Athlete's foot =

Skin infection caused by fungus

- Other names: Tinea pedis, ringworm of the foot, moccasin foot
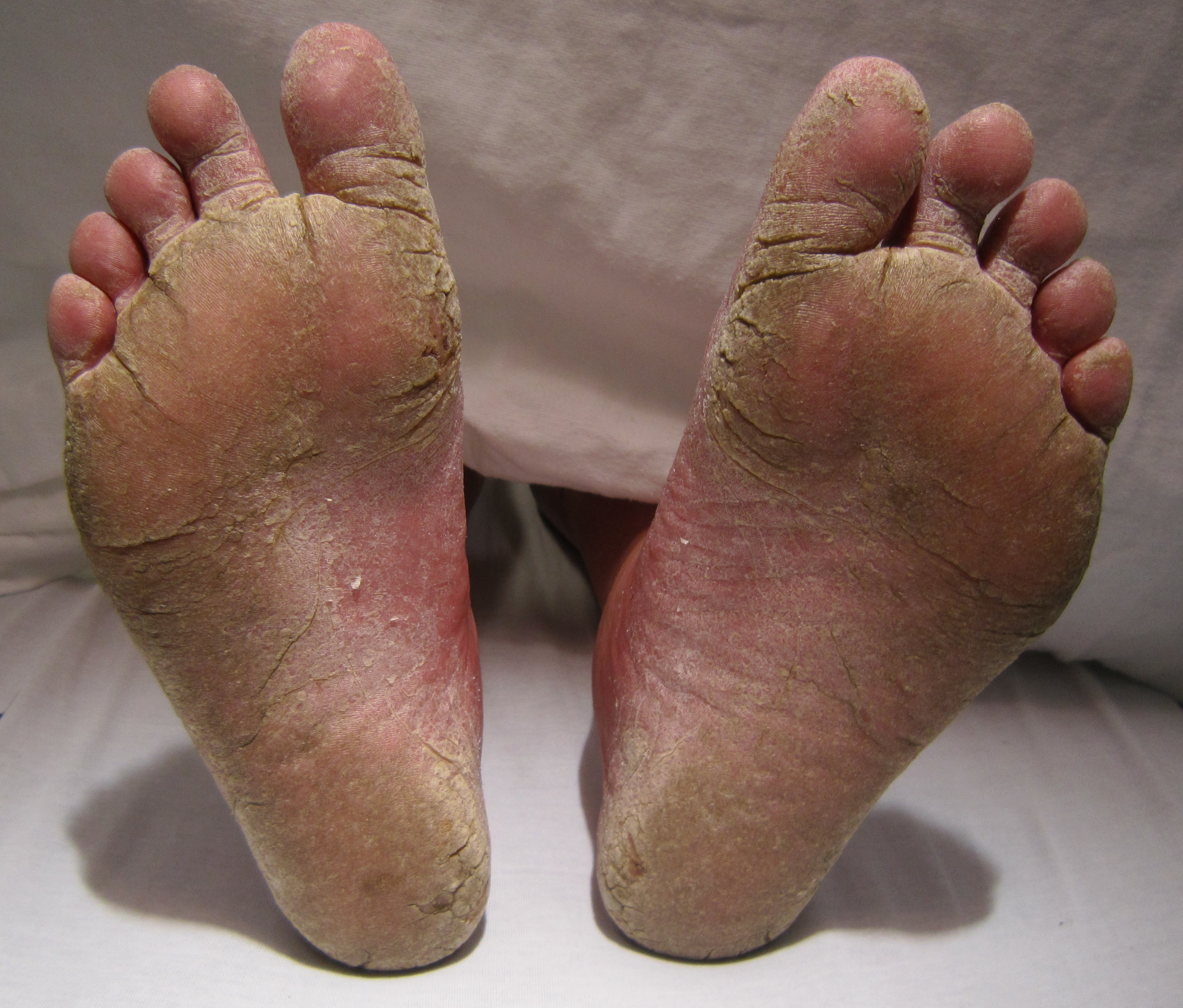
- A severe case of athlete's foot.
- Specialty: Dermatology, Infectious disease
- Symptoms: Itching, scaling, redness of the foot
- Causes: Fungi (Trichophyton, Epidermophyton, Microsporum)
- Diagnostic method: Based on symptoms, confirmed by culture or microscopy
- Prevention: Avoiding walking barefoot in public showers, keeping toenails short, wearing big enough shoes, changing socks daily
- Treatment: Antifungal medication applied to the skin or taken by mouth
- Frequency: 15% of the population

Athlete's foot, known medically as tinea pedis, is a common skin infection of the feet caused by a fungus. Signs and symptoms often include itching, scaling, cracking and redness. In rare cases the skin may blister. Athlete's foot fungus may infect any part of the foot, but most often grows between the toes. The next most common area is the bottom of the foot. The same fungus may also affect the nails or the hands. It is a member of the group of diseases known as tinea.

Athlete's foot is caused by a number of different funguses, including species of Trichophyton, Epidermophyton, and Microsporum. The condition is typically acquired by coming into contact with infected skin, or fungus in the environment. Common places where the fungi can survive are around swimming pools and in locker rooms. They may also be spread from other animals. Usually diagnosis is made based on signs and symptoms; however, it can be confirmed either by culture or seeing hyphae using a microscope.

Athlete's foot is not limited to just athletes: it can be caused by going barefoot in public showers, letting toenails grow too long, wearing shoes that are too tight, or not changing socks daily. It can be treated with topical antifungal medications such as clotrimazole or, for persistent infections, using oral antifungal medications such as terbinafine. Topical creams are typically recommended to be used for four weeks. Keeping infected feet dry and wearing sandals also assists with treatment.

Athlete's foot was first medically described in 1908. Globally, athlete's foot affects about 15% of the population. Males are more often affected than females. It occurs most frequently in older children or younger adults. Historically it is believed to have been a rare condition that became more frequent in the 20th century due to the greater use of shoes, health clubs, war, and travel.

== Signs and symptoms ==
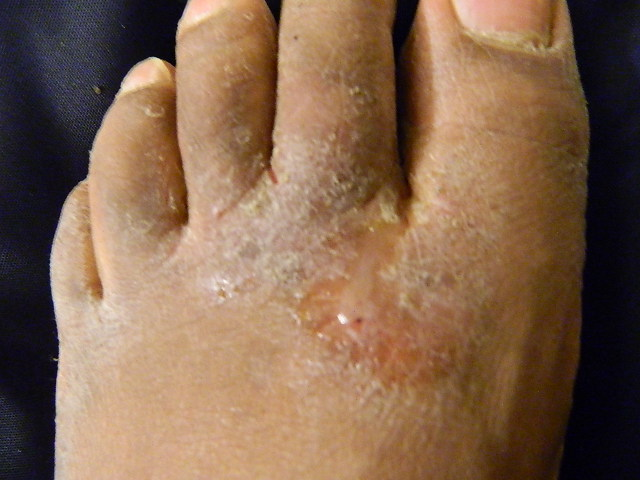
Athlete's foot

Athlete's foot is divided into four categories or presentations: chronic interdigital, plantar (chronic scaly; aka "moccasin foot"), acute ulcerative, and vesiculobullous. "Interdigital" means between the toes. "Plantar" here refers to the sole of the foot. The ulcerative condition includes macerated lesions with scaly borders. Maceration is the softening and breaking down of skin due to extensive exposure to moisture. A vesiculobullous disease is a type of mucocutaneous disease characterized by vesicles and bullae (blisters). Both vesicles and bullae are fluid-filled lesions, and they are distinguished by size (vesicles being less than 5 mm and bullae being larger than 5 mm, depending upon what definition is used).

Athlete's foot occurs most often between the toes (interdigital), with the space between the fourth and fifth digits (the little toe and the fore toe) most commonly affected. Cases of interdigital athlete's foot caused by Trichophyton rubrum may be symptomless, it may itch, or the skin between the toes may appear red or ulcerative (scaly, flaky, or soft and white if skin has been kept wet), with or without itching. An acute ulcerative variant of interdigital athlete's foot caused by T. mentagrophytes is characterized by pain, maceration of the skin, erosions and fissuring of the skin, crusting, and an odor due to secondary bacterial infection.

Plantar athlete's foot (moccasin foot) is also caused by T. rubrum which typically causes asymptomatic, slightly erythematous plaques (areas of redness of the skin) to form on the plantar surface (sole) of the foot that are often covered by fine, powdery hyperkeratotic scales.

The vesiculobullous type of athlete's foot is less common and is usually caused by T. mentagrophytes and is characterized by a sudden outbreak of itchy blisters and vesicles on an erythematous base, usually appearing on the sole of the foot. This subtype of athlete's foot is often complicated by secondary bacterial infection by Streptococcus pyogenes or Staphylococcus aureus.

=== Complications ===
As the disease progresses, the skin may crack, leading to bacterial skin infection and inflammation of the lymphatic vessels. If allowed to grow for too long, athlete's foot fungus may spread to infect the toenails, feeding on the keratin in them, a condition called onychomycosis.

Because athlete's foot may itch, it may also elicit the scratch reflex, causing the host to scratch the infected area before they realize it. Scratching can further damage the skin and worsen the condition by allowing the fungus to more easily spread and thrive. The itching sensation associated with athlete's foot can be so severe that it may cause hosts to scratch vigorously enough to inflict excoriations (open wounds), which are susceptible to bacterial infection. Further scratching may remove scabs, inhibiting the healing process. Scratching infected areas may also spread the fungus to the fingers and under the fingernails. If not washed away soon enough, it can infect the fingers and fingernails, growing in the skin and in the nails (not just underneath). After scratching, it can be spread to wherever the person touches, including other parts of the body and to one's environment. Scratching also causes infected skin scales to fall off into one's environment, leading to further possible spread. When athlete's foot fungus or infested skin particles spread to one's environment (such as to clothes, shoes, bathroom, etc.) whether through scratching, falling, or rubbing off, not only can they infect other people, they can also reinfect (or further infect) the host they came from. For example, infected feet infest one's socks and shoes which further expose the feet to the fungus and its spores when worn again.

The ease with which the fungus spreads to other areas of the body (on one's fingers) poses another complication. When the fungus is spread to other parts of the body, it can easily be spread back to the feet after the feet have been treated. And because the condition is called something else in each place it takes hold (e.g., tinea corporis (ringworm) or tinea cruris (jock itch)), persons infected may not be aware it is the same disease.

Some individuals may experience an allergic response to the fungus called an id reaction in which blisters or vesicles can appear in areas such as the hands, chest, and arms. Treatment of the underlying infection typically results in the disappearance of the id reaction.

== Causes ==
Athlete's foot is a form of dermatophytosis (fungal infection of the skin), caused by dermatophytes, fungi (most of which are mold) which inhabit dead layers of skin and digest keratin. Dermatophytes are anthropophilic, meaning these parasitic fungi prefer human hosts. Athlete's foot is most commonly caused by the molds known as Trichophyton rubrum and T. mentagrophytes, but may also be caused by Epidermophyton floccosum. Most cases of athlete's foot in the general population are caused by T. rubrum; however, the majority of athlete's foot cases in athletes are caused by T. mentagrophytes.

=== Transmission ===
According to the UK's National Health Service, "Athlete's foot is very contagious and can be spread through direct and indirect contact." The disease may spread to others directly when they touch the infection. People can contract the disease indirectly by coming into contact with contaminated items (clothes, towels, etc.) or surfaces (such as bathroom, shower, or locker room floors). The fungi that cause athlete's foot can easily spread to one's environment. Fungi rub off of fingers and bare feet, but also travel on the dead skin cells that continually fall off the body. Athlete's foot fungi and infested skin particles and flakes may spread to socks, shoes, clothes, to other people, pets (via petting), bed sheets, bathtubs, showers, sinks, counters, towels, rugs, floors, and carpets.

When the fungus has spread to pets, it can subsequently spread to the hands and fingers of people who pet them. If a pet frequently gnaws upon itself, it might not be fleas it is reacting to, it may be the insatiable itch of tinea.

One way to contract athlete's foot is to get a fungal infection somewhere else on the body first. The fungi causing athlete's foot may spread from other areas of the body to the feet, usually by touching or scratching the affected area, thereby getting the fungus on the fingers, and then touching or scratching the feet. While the fungus remains the same, the name of the condition changes based on where on the body the infection is located. For example, the infection is known as tinea corporis ("ringworm") when the torso or limbs are affected or tinea cruris (jock itch or dhobi itch) when the groin is affected. Clothes (or shoes), body heat, and sweat can keep the skin warm and moist, just the environment the fungus needs to thrive.

=== Risk factors ===
Besides being exposed to any of the modes of transmission presented above, there are additional risk factors that increase one's chance of contracting athlete's foot. Persons who have had athlete's foot before are more likely to become infected than those who have not. Adults are more likely to catch athlete's foot than children. Men have a higher chance of getting athlete's foot than women. People with diabetes or weakened immune systems are more susceptible to the disease. HIV/AIDS hampers the immune system and increases the risk of acquiring athlete's foot. Hyperhidrosis (abnormally increased sweating) increases the risk of infection and makes treatment more difficult.

== Diagnosis ==
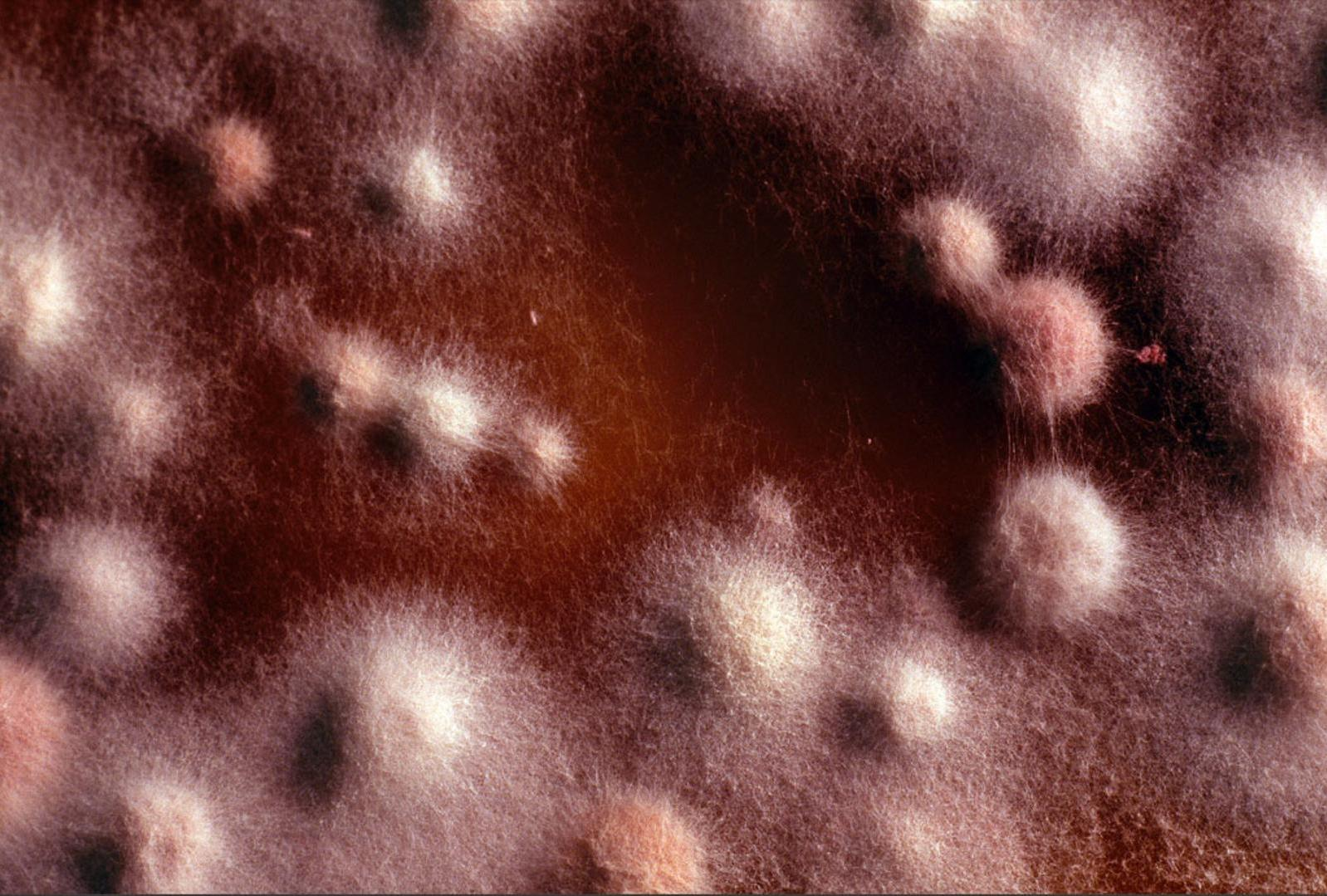
Microscopic view of cultured athlete's foot fungus

When visiting a doctor, the basic diagnosis procedure applies. This includes checking the patient's medical history and medical record for risk factors, a medical interview during which the doctor asks questions (such as about itching and scratching), and a physical examination. Athlete's foot can usually be diagnosed by visual inspection of the skin and by identifying less obvious symptoms such as itching of the affected area.

If the diagnosis is uncertain, direct microscopy of a potassium hydroxide preparation of a skin scraping (known as a KOH test) can confirm the diagnosis of athlete's foot and help rule out other possible causes, such as candidiasis, pitted keratolysis, erythrasma, contact dermatitis, eczema, or psoriasis. Dermatophytes known to cause athlete's foot will demonstrate multiple septate branching hyphae on microscopy.

A Wood's lamp (black light), although useful in diagnosing fungal infections of the scalp (tinea capitis), is not usually helpful in diagnosing athlete's foot, since the common dermatophytes that cause this disease do not fluoresce under ultraviolet light.

== Prevention ==
There are several preventive foot hygiene measures that can prevent athlete's foot and reduce recurrence. Some of these include: keeping the feet dry; clipping toenails short; using a separate nail clipper for infected toenails; using socks made from well-ventilated cotton or synthetic moisture wicking materials (to soak moisture away from the skin to help keep it dry); avoiding tight-fitting footwear; changing socks frequently; and wearing sandals while walking through communal areas such as gym showers and locker rooms.

According to the US Centers for Disease Control and Prevention, "Nails should be clipped short and kept clean. Nails can house and spread the infection." Recurrence of athlete's foot can be prevented with the use of antifungal powder on the feet.

The fungi (molds) that cause athlete's foot require warmth and moisture to survive and grow. There is an increased risk of infection with exposure to warm, moist environments (e.g., occlusive footwear—shoes or boots that enclose the feet) and in shared humid environments such as communal showers, shared pools, and treatment tubs. Chlorine bleach is a disinfectant and common household cleaner that kills mold. Cleaning surfaces with a chlorine bleach solution prevents the disease from spreading from subsequent contact. Cleaning bathtubs, showers, bathroom floors, sinks, and counters with bleach helps prevent the spread of the disease, including reinfection.

Keeping socks and shoes clean (using bleach in the wash) is one way to prevent fungi from taking hold and spreading, along with avoidance of sharing footwear and towels during an active fungal infection.

== Treatment ==
Athlete's foot resolves without medication in 30 to 40% of cases. Topical antifungal medication consistently produces much higher rates of cure.

Conventional treatment typically involves thoroughly washing the feet daily or twice daily, followed by the application of a topical medication. Because the outer skin layers are damaged and susceptible to reinfection, topical treatment generally continues until all layers of the skin are replaced, about 2 to 6 weeks after symptoms disappear. Keeping feet dry and practicing good hygiene (as described in the above section on prevention) is crucial for killing the fungus and preventing reinfection.

Treating the feet is not always enough. Once socks or shoes are infested with fungi, wearing them again can reinfect (or further infect) the feet. Socks can be effectively cleaned in the wash by adding bleach or by washing in water 60 °C (140 °F).

To be effective, treatment includes all infected areas (such as toenails, hands, torso, etc.). Otherwise, the infection may continue to spread, including back to treated areas. For example, leaving fungal infection of the nail untreated may allow it to spread back to the rest of the foot, to become athlete's foot once again.

Systematic review found that allylamines such as terbinafine are not more efficacious than azoles for the treatment of athlete's foot.

Severe or prolonged fungal skin infections may require treatment with oral antifungal medication.

=== Topical treatments ===
There are many topical antifungal drugs useful in the treatment of athlete's foot including: miconazole nitrate, clotrimazole, ketoconazole, tolnaftate (a synthetic thiocarbamate), terbinafine hydrochloride, butenafine hydrochloride and undecylenic acid. The fungal infection may be treated with topical antifungal agents, which can take the form of a spray, powder, cream, or gel. Topical application of an antifungal cream such as butenafine once daily for one week or terbinafine once daily for two weeks is effective in most cases of athlete's foot and is more effective than application of miconazole or clotrimazole. Plantar-type athlete's foot is more resistant to topical treatments due to the presence of thickened hyperkeratotic skin on the sole of the foot. Keratolytic and humectant medications such as urea, salicylic acid (Whitfield's ointment), and lactic acid are useful adjunct medications and improve penetration of antifungal agents into the thickened skin. Topical glucocorticoids are sometimes prescribed to alleviate inflammation and itching associated with the infection.

A solution of 1% potassium permanganate dissolved in hot water is an alternative to antifungal drugs. Potassium permanganate is a salt and a strong oxidizing agent.

=== Oral treatments ===
For severe or refractory cases of athlete's foot oral terbinafine is more effective than griseofulvin. Fluconazole or itraconazole may also be taken orally for severe athlete's foot infections. The most commonly reported adverse effect from these medications is gastrointestinal upset.

== Epidemiology ==
Globally, fungal infections affect about 15% of the population and 20% of adults. Additionally, 70% of the population will experience athlete's foot at some point in life. Athlete's foot is common in individuals who wear unventilated (occlusive) footwear, such as rubber boots or vinyl shoes. Upon exposure to an athlete's foot-causing fungus, the moist conditions generated from poor foot ventilation promotes growth of the fungus on the foot or between the toes. Occupationally, studies have shown increased prevalence of athlete's foot among miners, soldiers, and athletes. Likewise, activities such as marathon running have seen increased prevalence of athlete's foot. Countries and regions where going barefoot is more common experience much lower rates of athlete's foot than do populations which habitually wear shoes; as a result, the disease has been called "a penalty of civilization". Studies have demonstrated that men are infected 2 to 4 times more often than women.

Cases of athlete's foot were first documented around 1916 during World War I, where infection among soldiers was common. By 1928, it was estimated that nearly ten million Americans suffered from athlete's foot; the alarming prevalence of the disease caused widespread public health concern. In the following year, an epidemiologic study was conducted on incoming freshman to the University of California; it was found that 53% of incoming freshman men had athlete's foot and by year's end that number had risen to 78%.

Prevalence of the disease increased in the 1930s, specifically among individuals of higher socioeconomic status; these individuals had more access to common shared spaced such as pools, colleges, and athletic clubs where transmission of athlete's foot-causing fungus was common. Prevalence in the United States was high enough to call for the use of sterilizing footbaths in the 1932 Olympics in Los Angeles. It was at this time public health officials adopted the idea that athletes foot was a product of modernity and that dealing with this disease was "a penalty of civilization" as many treatments proved ineffective. Antifungal properties of compounds such as undecylenic acid were studied in the 1940s; products containing zinc undecylenate were shown to be the most effective topical treatment for curing the condition.

The use of orally ingested Griseofulvin was shown in the 1960s to be effective in acute cases of athlete's foot. Likewise, recorded incidence of athletes foot decreased among American soldiers in Vietnam who were given Griseofulvins as a preventative drug. In the 1990s, research supported the use of itraconazole and the Allylamine known as terbinafine as drugs effective at eliminating athlete's foot and also dermatophyte infections on other parts of the body. As of 2012, research has shown that terbinafine is 2.26 times as likely to cure athlete's foot than treatment with Griseofulvin; comparative studies between itraconazole and terbinafine have shown little difference in effectiveness.

== See also ==
- Toenail fungus, tinea unguium, an infection affecting the toenails
- Trench foot, due to moisture and decay
