= Allylamine =

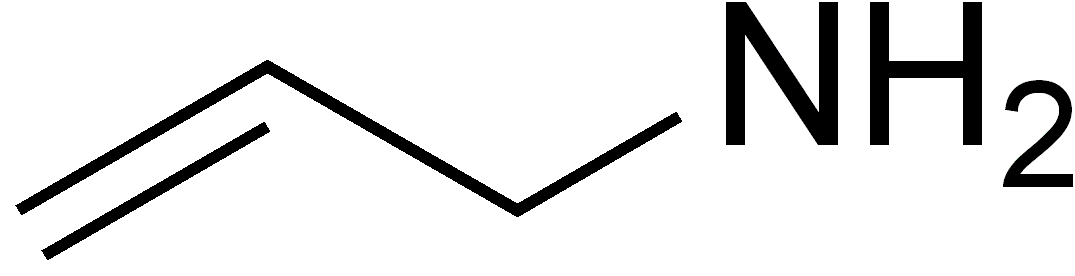

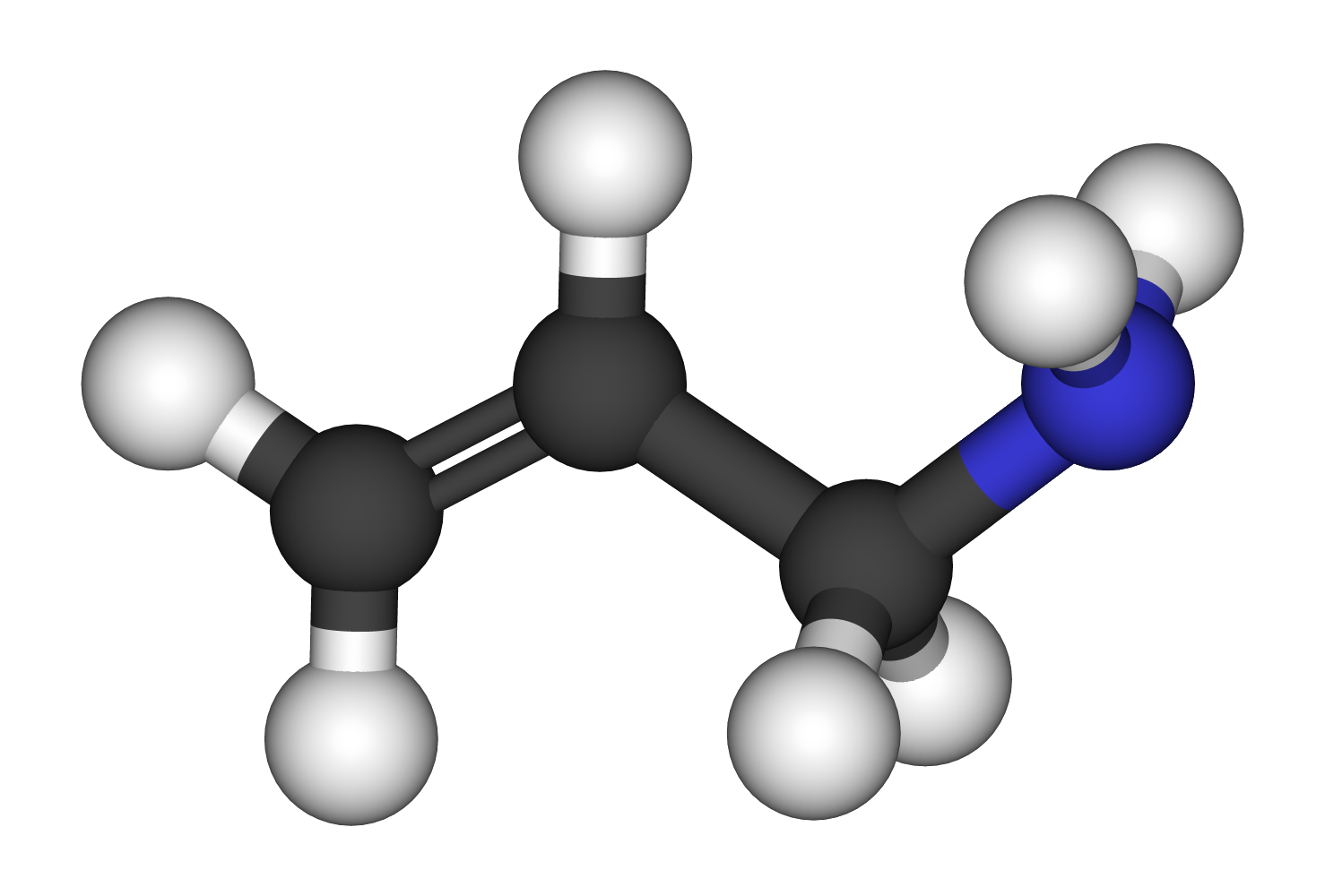

Names
- Preferred IUPAC name Prop-2-en-1-amine
- Other names 2-Propen-1-amine; 2-Propenamine; Allyl amine 3-Amino-prop-1-ene; 3-Aminopropene; 3-Aminopropylene; Monoallylamine

Identifiers
CAS Number	107-11-9
3D model (JSmol)	Interactive image
ChEMBL	ChEMBL57286
ChemSpider	13835977
ECHA InfoCard	100.003.150
EC Number	203-463-9
PubChem CID	7853
RTECS number	BA5425000
UNII	48G762T011
UN number	2334
CompTox Dashboard (EPA)	DTXSID8024440
- InChI: InChI=1S/C3H7N/c1-2-3-4/h2H,1,3-4H2 Key: VVJKKWFAADXIJK-UHFFFAOYSA-N; InChI=1/C3H7N/c1-2-3-4/h2H,1,3-4H2 Key: VVJKKWFAADXIJK-UHFFFAOYAW
- SMILES: C=CCN

Properties
Chemical formula	C_{3}H_{7}N
Molar mass	57.096 g·mol^{−1}
Appearance	Colorless liquid
Density	0.7630 g/cm^{3}, liquid
Melting point	−88 °C (−126 °F; 185 K)
Boiling point	55 to 58 °C (131 to 136 °F; 328 to 331 K)
Acidity (pK_{a})	9.49 (conjugate acid; H_{2}O)

Hazards
- Occupational safety and health (OHS/OSH)
Main hazards	Lachrymatory
- GHS labelling
Pictograms	(GHS02: Flammable) (GHS06: Toxic) (GHS07: Exclamation mark) (GHS08: Health hazard) (GHS09: Environmental hazard)
Signal word	Danger
Hazard statements	H225, H301, H310, H315, H319, H330, H335, H371, H373, H411
Precautionary statements	P210, P233, P240, P241, P242, P243, P260, P262, P264, P270, P271, P273, P280, P284, P301+P310, P302+P350, P302+P352, P303+P361+P353, P304+P340, P305+P351+P338, P309+P311, P310, P312, P314, P320, P321, P330, P332+P313, P337+P313, P361, P362, P363, P370+P378, P391, P403+P233, P403+P235, P405, P501
NFPA 704 (fire diamond)	4 3
Flash point	−28 °C (−18 °F; 245 K)
Autoignition temperature	374 °C (705 °F; 647 K)
Explosive limits	2-22%
- Lethal dose or concentration (LD, LC)
LD_{50} (median dose)	106 mg/kg

Related compounds
Related amine	Propylamine
Related compounds	Allyl alcohol
- Except where otherwise noted, data are given for materials in their standard state (at 25 °C [77 °F], 100 kPa). verify (what is ?) Infobox references

Allylamine is an organic compound with the formula C_{3}H_{5}NH_{2}. This colorless liquid is the simplest stable unsaturated amine.

== Production and reactions ==
All three allylamines, mono-, di-, and triallylamine, are produced by the treating allyl chloride with ammonia followed by distillation. Or by the reaction of allyl chloride with hexamine. Pure samples can be prepared by hydrolysis of allyl isothiocyanate. It behaves as a typical amine.

Polymerization can be used to prepare the homopolymer (polyallylamine) or copolymers. The polymers are promising membranes for use in reverse osmosis.

== Other allylamines ==
Diallylamine is a precursor to industrial products. Functionalized allylamines have pharmaceutical applications. Pharmaceutically important allylamines include flunarizine and naftifine; the latter spurred the development of Petasis' borono-Mannich reaction. Flunarizine aids in the relief of migraines while naftifine acts to fight common fungus causing infections such as athlete's foot, jock itch, and ringworm.

Flunarizine and naftifine are pharmacologically active allylamines.

== Safety ==
Allylamine, like other allyl derivatives is a lachrymator and skin irritant. Its oral LD_{50} is 106 mg/kg for rats.
