= Flutrimazole =

Chemical compound

Clinical data
- AHFS/Drugs.com: International Drug Names
- ATC code: D01AC16 (WHO) G01AF18 (WHO)

Identifiers
- IUPAC name: (RS)-1-[(2-Fluorophenyl)(4-fluorophenyl)benzyl]-1H-imidazole
- CAS Number: 119006-77-8
- PubChem CID: 3401
- ChemSpider: 3284
- UNII: 776S0UP252
- KEGG: D07193
- ChEBI: CHEBI:82864
- ChEMBL: ChEMBL2107430
- CompTox Dashboard (EPA): DTXSID30869622
- ECHA InfoCard: 100.170.770

Chemical and physical data
- Formula: C_{22}H_{16}F_{2}N_{2}
- Molar mass: 346.381 g·mol^{−1}
- 3D model (JSmol): Interactive image
- Chirality: Racemic mixture
- SMILES: Fc1ccc(cc1)C(c2c(F)cccc2)(c3ccccc3)n4ccnc4
- InChI: InChI=1S/C22H16F2N2/c23-19-12-10-18(11-13-19)22(26-15-14-25-16-26,17-6-2-1-3-7-17)20-8-4-5-9-21(20)24/h1-16H; Key:QHMWCHQXCUNUAK-UHFFFAOYSA-N

Flutrimazole is a wide-spectrum antifungal drug. It is used for the topical treatment of superficial mycoses of the skin. Flutrimazole is an imidazole derivative. Its antifungal activity has been demonstrated in in vivo and in vitro studies to be comparable to that of clotrimazole and higher than bifonazole.

== Mechanism of action ==
It interferes with the synthesis of ergosterol by inhibiting the activity of the enzyme lanosterol 14 α-demethylase.

== See also ==
- Clotrimazole
