= Tioconazole =

Chemical compound

Clinical data
- Trade names: Vagistat-1, 1-Day
- Other names: Thioconazole
- AHFS/Drugs.com: Monograph
- Routes of administration: Topical
- ATC code: D01AC07 (WHO) G01AF08 (WHO)

Legal status
- Legal status: US: OTC

Identifiers
- IUPAC name: (RS)-1-[2-[(2-Chloro-3-thienyl)methoxy]-2-(2,4-dichlorophenyl)ethyl]-1H-imidazole
- CAS Number: 65899-73-2
- PubChem CID: 5482
- DrugBank: DB01007
- ChemSpider: 5282
- UNII: S57Y5X1117
- KEGG: D00890
- ChEBI: CHEBI:9604
- ChEMBL: ChEMBL1200438
- CompTox Dashboard (EPA): DTXSID3046619
- ECHA InfoCard: 100.059.958

Chemical and physical data
- Formula: C_{16}H_{13}Cl_{3}N_{2}OS
- Molar mass: 387.70 g·mol^{−1}
- 3D model (JSmol): Interactive image
- Chirality: Racemic mixture
- SMILES: ClC1=CC=C(C(OCC2=C(Cl)SC=C2)CN3C=CN=C3)C(Cl)=C1

Tioconazole is an antifungal medication of the imidazole class used to treat infections caused by a fungus or yeast. It is marketed under the brand names Trosyd and Gyno-Trosyd (Pfizer, later Johnson & Johnson and now Kenvue). Tioconazole ointments serve to treat women's vaginal yeast infections. They are available in one day doses, as opposed to the 7-day treatments commonly used in the past.

Tioconazole topical (skin) preparations are also available for ringworm, jock itch, athlete's foot, and tinea versicolor or "sun fungus".

Tioconazole is known to bind to tubulin and inhibit its polymerization.

It was patented in 1975 and approved for medical use in 1982.

== Side effects ==
Side effects of vaginal tioconazole may include temporary burning itching, or irritation of the vagina. Vaginal swelling or redness, difficulty or burning during urination, headache, abdominal pain, and upper respiratory tract infection have been reported by people using tioconazole. These side effects may be only temporary, and do not normally interfere with the patient's comfort enough to outweigh the result.

== Synthesis ==
Tiaconazole synthesis

Tioconazole can be synthesized by a displacement reaction between 1-(2,4-dichlorophenyl)-2-(1H-imidazol-1-yl)ethanol and 2-chloro-3-(chloromethyl)thiophene.
