= Tolciclate =

Chemical compound

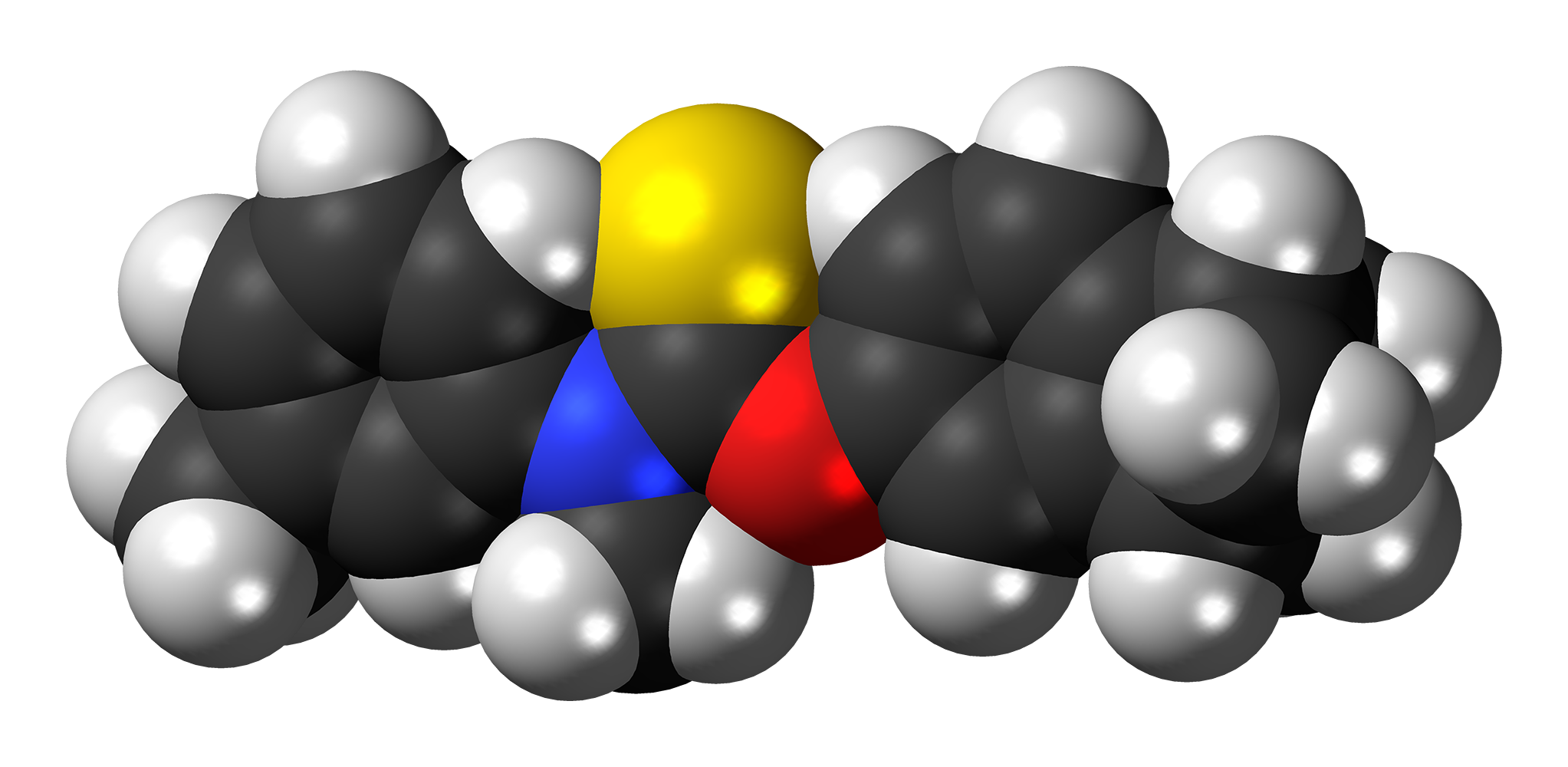

Clinical data
- Other names: O-(1,2,3,4-Tetrahydro-1,4-methanonaphthalen-6-yl) m,N-dimethylthiocarbanilate
- AHFS/Drugs.com: International Drug Names
- ATC code: D01AE19 (WHO)

Identifiers
- IUPAC name: O-Tricyclo[6.2.1.0^{2,7}]undeca-2,4,6-trien-4-yl methyl(3-methylphenyl)carbamothioate
- CAS Number: 50838-36-3
- PubChem CID: 5506
- ChemSpider: 5305
- UNII: T3TZ02X2AZ
- KEGG: D01384
- CompTox Dashboard (EPA): DTXSID0057758
- ECHA InfoCard: 100.051.611

Chemical and physical data
- Formula: C_{20}H_{21}NOS
- Molar mass: 323.45 g·mol^{−1}
- 3D model (JSmol): Interactive image
- SMILES: Cc1cccc(c1)N(C)C(=S)Oc2ccc3c(c2)C4CCC3C4
- InChI: InChI=1S/C20H21NOS/c1-13-4-3-5-16(10-13)21(2)20(23)22-17-8-9-18-14-6-7-15(11-14)19(18)12-17/h3-5,8-10,12,14-15H,6-7,11H2,1-2H3; Key:CANCCLAKQQHLNK-UHFFFAOYSA-N

Tolciclate (INN) is an antifungal medication.

== See also ==
- Tolnaftate
