= Pecilocin =

Names
- Preferred IUPAC name 1-[(2E,4E,6E,8R)-8-Hydroxy-6-methyldodeca-2,4,6-trienoyl]pyrrolidin-2-one
- Other names Latin: pecilocinum

Identifiers
CAS Number	19504-77-9
3D model (JSmol)	Interactive image
ChEMBL	ChEMBL486174
ChemSpider	4445371
ECHA InfoCard	100.039.182
EC Number	243-116-9
KEGG	D01458
PubChem CID	5282176
UNII	TSA7W27MF8
CompTox Dashboard (EPA)	DTXSID5057676
- InChI: InChI=1S/C17H25NO3/c1-3-4-9-15(19)13-14(2)8-5-6-10-16(20)18-12-7-11-17(18)21/h5-6,8,10,13,15,19H,3-4,7,9,11-12H2,1-2H3/b8-5+,10-6+,14-13+/t15-/m1/s1 Key: ZYPGADGCNXOUJP-CXVPHVKISA-N; InChI=1/C17H25NO3/c1-3-4-9-15(19)13-14(2)8-5-6-10-16(20)18-12-7-11-17(18)21/h5-6,8,10,13,15,19H,3-4,7,9,11-12H2,1-2H3/b8-5+,10-6+,14-13+/t15-/m1/s1 Key: ZYPGADGCNXOUJP-CXVPHVKIBE
- SMILES: CCCC[C@H](/C=C(\C)/C=C/C=C/C(=O)N1CCCC1=O)O

Properties
Chemical formula	C_{17}H_{25}NO_{3}
Molar mass	291.3853
Appearance	colorless oily substance
Solubility in water	0.181 mg/ml
Solubility in organic solvents	high

Pharmacology
Drug class	antifungal
ATC code	D01AA04 (WHO)
Routes of administration	topical (cream or solution)
- Except where otherwise noted, data are given for materials in their standard state (at 25 °C [77 °F], 100 kPa). verify (what is ?) Infobox references

Pecilocin (brand name Variotin) is a pyrrolidine anti-fungal. It is produced by Paecilomyces varioti Bainer var. antibioticus and was first isolated by Setsuo Takeuchi in 1959. Later, it was established that other fungi also produce this compound, which include Aspergillus candidus and Aspergillus montenegroi.

== Uses ==
Pecilocin is indicated for topical treatment of fungal infections of skin and its adnexa, i.e.:

- skin mycoses (including tinea versicolor)
- onchomycosis
- scalp infections (e.g. tinea capitis)

=== Antifungal spectrum ===
Pecilocin is a fungistatic and has activity against genera Blastomyces, Cryptococcus, Epidermophyton, Microsporum and Trichophyton (with MIC less or equal to 0,25 μg/ml). C. albicans is inherently resistant.

== Adverse effects ==
Common adverse effects associated with pecilocin include: skin irritation (observed in 2-6.5% of patients), as well as contact dermatitis. Some patients might exhibit allergy to pecilocin.

== Biosynthesis ==
A radioactive carbon study of pecilocin biosynthetic pathway conducted by Nobuo Tanaka showed it is synthesised from acetic acid, glutamate and L-methionine.
