= Luliconazole =

Chemical compound

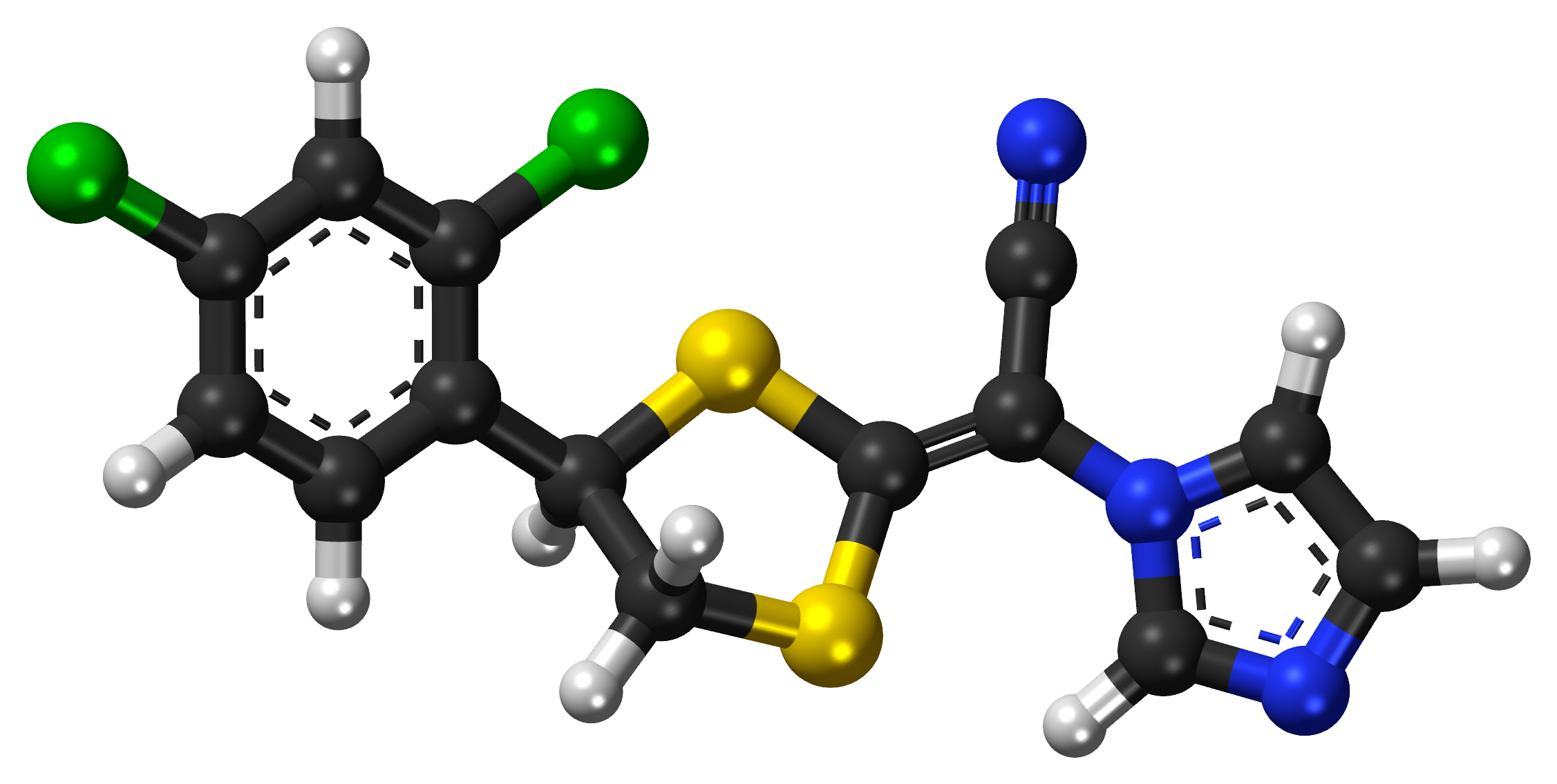

Clinical data
- Trade names: Luzu, Luzarn, Lulicon, LULY, Zyluli, Luris
- Routes of administration: Topical
- ATC code: D01AC18 (WHO)

Legal status
- Legal status: In general: ℞ (Prescription only)

Pharmacokinetic data
- Protein binding: >99%

Identifiers
- IUPAC name: (2E)-[(4R)-4-(2,4-Dichlorophenyl)-1,3-dithiolan-2-ylidene](1H-imidazol-1-yl)acetonitrile
- CAS Number: 187164-19-8
- PubChem CID: 3003141
- DrugBank: DB08933
- ChemSpider: 2273807
- UNII: RE91AN4S8G
- CompTox Dashboard (EPA): DTXSID3048607

Chemical and physical data
- Formula: C_{14}H_{9}Cl_{2}N_{3}S_{2}
- Molar mass: 354.27 g·mol^{−1}
- 3D model (JSmol): Interactive image
- SMILES: C1[C@H](S/C(=C(\C#N)/N2C=CN=C2)/S1)C3=C(C=C(C=C3)Cl)Cl
- InChI: InChI=1S/C14H9Cl2N3S2/c15-9-1-2-10(11(16)5-9)13-7-20-14(21-13)12(6-17)19-4-3-18-8-19/h1-5,8,13H,7H2/b14-12+/t13-/m0/s1; Key:YTAOBBFIOAEMLL-REQDGWNSSA-N

Luliconazole, trade names Luzu among others, is an imidazole antifungal medication. As a 1% topical cream, It is indicated for the treatment of athlete's foot, jock itch, and ringworm caused by dermatophytes such as Trichophyton rubrum, Microsporum gypseum, and Epidermophyton floccosum.
