= ATC code D01 =

ATC code D01 Antifungals for dermatological use is a therapeutic subgroup of the Anatomical Therapeutic Chemical Classification System, a system of alphanumeric codes developed by the World Health Organization (WHO) for the classification of drugs and other medical products. Subgroup D01 is part of the anatomical group D Dermatologicals.

Codes for veterinary use (ATCvet codes) can be created by placing the letter Q in front of the human ATC code: for example, QD01. ATCvet codes without corresponding human ATC codes are cited with the leading Q in the following list.
National versions of the ATC classification may include additional codes not present in this list, which follows the WHO version.

== D01A Antifungals for topical use ==
=== D01AA Antibiotics ===
D01AA01 Nystatin
D01AA02 Natamycin
D01AA03 Hachimycin
D01AA04 Pecilocin
D01AA06 Mepartricin
D01AA07 Pyrrolnitrin
D01AA08 Griseofulvin
D01AA20 Antibiotics in combination with corticosteroids

=== D01AC Imidazole and triazole derivatives ===
D01AC01 Clotrimazole
D01AC02 Miconazole
D01AC03 Econazole
D01AC04 Clomidazole
D01AC05 Isoconazole
D01AC06 Tiabendazole
D01AC07 Tioconazole
D01AC08 Ketoconazole
D01AC09 Sulconazole
D01AC10 Bifonazole
D01AC11 Oxiconazole
D01AC12 Fenticonazole
D01AC13 Omoconazole
D01AC14 Sertaconazole
D01AC15 Fluconazole
D01AC16 Flutrimazole
D01AC17 Eberconazole
D01AC18 Luliconazole
D01AC19 Efinaconazole
D01AC20 Imidazoles/triazoles in combination with corticosteroids
D01AC21 Neticonazole
D01AC22 Lanoconazole
D01AC52 Miconazole, combinations
D01AC60 Bifonazole, combinations
QD01AC90 Enilconazole

=== D01AE Other antifungals for topical use ===
D01AE01 Bromochlorosalicylanilide
D01AE02 Methylrosaniline
D01AE03 Tribromometacresol
D01AE04 Undecylenic acid
D01AE05 Polynoxylin
D01AE06 2-(4-chlorphenoxy)-ethanol
D01AE07 Chlorphenesin
D01AE08 Ticlatone
D01AE09 Sulbentine
D01AE10 Ethyl hydroxybenzoate
D01AE11 Haloprogin
D01AE12 Salicylic acid
D01AE13 Selenium sulfide
D01AE14 Ciclopirox
D01AE15 Terbinafine
D01AE16 Amorolfine
D01AE17 Dimazole
D01AE18 Tolnaftate
D01AE19 Tolciclate
D01AE20 Combinations
D01AE21 Flucytosine
D01AE22 Naftifine
D01AE23 Butenafine
D01AE24 Tavaborole
D01AE25 Liranaftate
D01AE54 Undecylenic acid, combinations
QD01AE91 Bronopol
QD01AE92 Bensuldazic acid

== D01B Antifungals for systemic use ==
=== D01BA Antifungals for systemic use ===
D01BA01 Griseofulvin
D01BA02 Terbinafine
D01BA03 Fosravuconazole
