= Liranaftate =

Chemical compound

Clinical data
- Trade names: Zefnart
- Other names: M-732; piritetrate
- Routes of administration: Topical
- ATC code: D01AE25 (WHO)

Legal status
- Legal status: JP: Rx-only

Identifiers
- IUPAC name: O-(5,6,7,8-Tetrahydronaphthalen-2-yl) N-(6-methoxypyridin-2-yl)-N-methylcarbamothioate
- CAS Number: 88678-31-3
- PubChem CID: 3936
- ChemSpider: 3799
- UNII: 5253IGO5X3
- KEGG: D01550
- CompTox Dashboard (EPA): DTXSID6046470

Chemical and physical data
- Formula: C_{18}H_{20}N_{2}O_{2}S
- Molar mass: 328.43 g·mol^{−1}

Liranaftate (trade name Zefnart) is a topical antifungal drug. It is used as a 2% cream used to treat tinea pedis (athlete's foot), tinea corporis (ringworm), and tinea cruris (jock itch). It was approved for use in Japan in August 2000.

Liranaftate works by inhibiting the fungal enzyme squalene epoxidase that is necessary for the fungus to synthesize sterols which are essential for cell membrane integrity.
