= Sulconazole =

Chemical compound

Clinical data
- Trade names: Exelderm
- AHFS/Drugs.com: Monograph
- MedlinePlus: a698018
- Routes of administration: Topical
- ATC code: D01AC09 (WHO)

Identifiers
- IUPAC name: 1-(2-{[(4-Chlorophenyl)methyl]sulfanyl}-2-(2,4-dichlorophenyl)ethyl)-1H-imidazole
- CAS Number: 61318-90-9
- PubChem CID: 5318
- DrugBank: DB06820
- ChemSpider: 5127
- UNII: 5D9HAA5Q5S
- KEGG: D08535
- ChEBI: CHEBI:9325
- ChEMBL: ChEMBL1221
- CompTox Dashboard (EPA): DTXSID8044129

Chemical and physical data
- Formula: C_{18}H_{15}Cl_{3}N_{2}S
- Molar mass: 397.74 g·mol^{−1}
- 3D model (JSmol): Interactive image
- SMILES: Clc1ccc(c(Cl)c1)C(SCc2ccc(Cl)cc2)Cn3ccnc3
- InChI: InChI=1S/C18H15Cl3N2S/c19-14-3-1-13(2-4-14)11-24-18(10-23-8-7-22-12-23)16-6-5-15(20)9-17(16)21/h1-9,12,18H,10-11H2; Key:AFNXATANNDIXLG-UHFFFAOYSA-N

Sulconazole (trade name Exelderm) is an antifungal medication of the imidazole class. It is available as a cream or solution to treat skin infections such as athlete's foot, ringworm, jock itch, and tinea versicolor. Although not used commercially for insect control, sulconazole nitrate exhibits a strong anti-feeding effect on the keratin-digesting Australian carpet beetle larvae Anthrenocerus australis.
