= Neticonazole =

Chemical compound

Clinical data
- AHFS/Drugs.com: International Drug Names
- ATC code: D01AC21 (WHO)

Identifiers
- IUPAC name: 1-{(E)-2-(Methylthio)-1-[2-(pentyloxy)phenyl]vinyl}-1H-imidazole
- CAS Number: 130726-68-0
- PubChem CID: 5282433
- ChemSpider: 4445587
- UNII: KVL61ZF9UO
- ChEBI: CHEBI:135281
- CompTox Dashboard (EPA): DTXSID4057633

Chemical and physical data
- Formula: C_{17}H_{22}N_{2}OS
- Molar mass: 302.44 g·mol^{−1}
- 3D model (JSmol): Interactive image
- SMILES: CCCCCOc1ccccc1/C(=C\SC)/n2ccnc2
- InChI: InChI=1S/C17H22N2OS/c1-3-4-7-12-20-17-9-6-5-8-15(17)16(13-21-2)19-11-10-18-14-19/h5-6,8-11,13-14H,3-4,7,12H2,1-2H3/b16-13+; Key:VWOIKFDZQQLJBJ-DTQAZKPQSA-N

Neticonazole (INN) is an imidazole antifungal for the treatment of fungal skin infections.

Neticonazole is only approved for use in Japan. It is sold as a topical ointment under the tradename Atolant.
