= Dimazole =

Chemical compound

Clinical data
- ATC code: D01AE17 (WHO)

Identifiers
- IUPAC name: [6-(2-Diethylamino-ethoxy)-benzothiazol-2-yl]-dimethyl-amine
- CAS Number: 95-27-2
- PubChem CID: 8708
- ChemSpider: 8384
- UNII: 2KL01R8ZV1
- CompTox Dashboard (EPA): DTXSID1046182
- ECHA InfoCard: 100.002.188

Chemical and physical data
- Formula: C_{15}H_{23}N_{3}OS
- Molar mass: 293.43 g·mol^{−1}
- 3D model (JSmol): Interactive image
- Melting point: 195 to 204 °C (383 to 399 °F)
- SMILES: CCN(CC)CCOc1ccc2c(c1)sc(n2)N(C)C
- InChI: InChI=1S/C15H23N3OS/c1-5-18(6-2)9-10-19-12-7-8-13-14(11-12)20-15(16-13)17(3)4/h7-8,11H,5-6,9-10H2,1-4H3; Key:WGMYEOIMVYADRJ-UHFFFAOYSA-N

Dimazole (or diamthazole) is an antifungal compound.
