= Haloprogin =

Chemical compound

Clinical data
- Routes of administration: Topical
- ATC code: D01AE11 (WHO)

Legal status
- Legal status: US: Not available

Identifiers
- IUPAC name: 1,2,4-Trichloro-5-[(3-iodoprop-2-yn-1-yl)oxy]benzene
- CAS Number: 777-11-7
- PubChem CID: 3561
- DrugBank: DB00793
- ChemSpider: 3440
- UNII: AIU7053OWL
- KEGG: D00339
- ChEMBL: ChEMBL1289
- CompTox Dashboard (EPA): DTXSID9046865
- ECHA InfoCard: 100.011.169

Chemical and physical data
- Formula: C_{9}H_{4}Cl_{3}IO
- Molar mass: 361.38 g·mol^{−1}
- 3D model (JSmol): Interactive image
- Melting point: 113.5 °C (236.3 °F)
- Solubility in water: Insoluble mg/mL (20 °C)
- SMILES: Clc1cc(OCC#CI)c(Cl)cc1Cl
- InChI: InChI=1S/C9H4Cl3IO/c10-6-4-8(12)9(5-7(6)11)14-3-1-2-13/h4-5H,3H2; Key:CTETYYAZBPJBHE-UHFFFAOYSA-N

Haloprogin is an antifungal drug used to treat athlete's foot and other fungal infections. It is marketed in creams under the trade names Halotex, Mycanden, Mycilan, and Polik.

== Action ==
Haloprogin was previously used in 1% topical creams as an antifungal agent. It was marketed over-the-counter primarily to treat tinea infections of the skin. The mechanism of action is unknown.

Haloprogin had a high incidence of side effects including: irritation, burning, vesiculation (blisters), scaling, and itching. It has since been discontinued due to the emergence of more modern antifungals with fewer side effects.
