= Omoconazole =

Chemical compound

Clinical data
- AHFS/Drugs.com: International Drug Names
- ATC code: D01AC13 (WHO) G01AF16 (WHO)

Identifiers
- IUPAC name: 1-[(Z)-2-[2-(4-Chlorophenoxy)ethoxy]-2-(2,4-dichlorophenyl)-1-methylvinyl]-1H-imidazole
- CAS Number: 74512-12-2
- PubChem CID: 3033988
- ChemSpider: 2298546
- UNII: GQ8ADD54E1
- KEGG: D08296
- CompTox Dashboard (EPA): DTXSID7057818

Chemical and physical data
- Formula: C_{13}H_{17}N_{2}O_{2}
- Molar mass: 233.291 g·mol^{−1}
- 3D model (JSmol): Interactive image
- SMILES: Clc3ccc(C(/OCCOc1ccc(Cl)cc1)=C(/n2ccnc2)C)c(Cl)c3
- InChI: InChI=1S/C20H17Cl3N2O2/c1-14(25-9-8-24-13-25)20(18-7-4-16(22)12-19(18)23)27-11-10-26-17-5-2-15(21)3-6-17/h2-9,12-13H,10-11H2,1H3/b20-14-; Key:JMFOSJNGKJCTMJ-ZHZULCJRSA-N

Omoconazole is an azole antifungal drug.

Omonocazole is not available in the United States and Canada. In other countries, it is used to treat cutaneous candidiasis, dermatophytosis, pityriasis versicolor.
