= Sulbentine =

Chemical compound

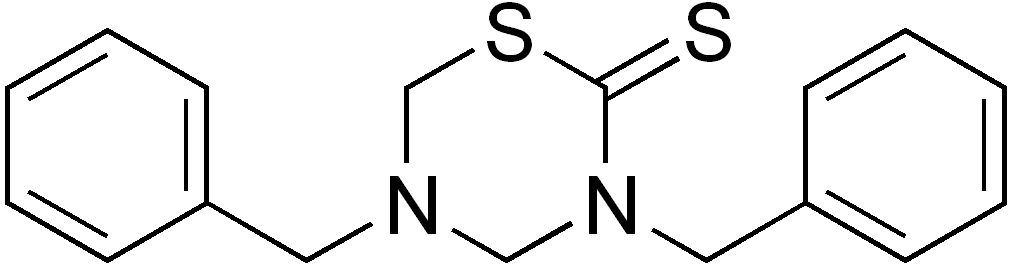

Clinical data
- ATC code: D01AE09 (WHO)

Identifiers
- IUPAC name: 3,5-bis(phenylmethyl)-1,3,5-thiadiazinane-2-thione
- CAS Number: 350-12-9
- PubChem CID: 67686
- ChemSpider: 61005
- UNII: D0NR12WK9J
- KEGG: D01335
- CompTox Dashboard (EPA): DTXSID7046257
- ECHA InfoCard: 100.005.907

Chemical and physical data
- Formula: C_{17}H_{18}N_{2}S_{2}
- Molar mass: 314.46 g·mol^{−1}
- 3D model (JSmol): Interactive image
- SMILES: c1ccc(cc1)CN2CN(C(=S)SC2)Cc3ccccc3
- InChI: InChI=1S/C17H18N2S2/c20-17-19(12-16-9-5-2-6-10-16)13-18(14-21-17)11-15-7-3-1-4-8-15/h1-10H,11-14H2; Key:QFVAWNPSRQWSDU-UHFFFAOYSA-N

Sulbentine (or dibenzthione) is an antifungal.
