= Eberconazole =

Chemical compound

Clinical data
- Trade names: Ebernet

Legal status
- Legal status: US: Not FDA approved

Identifiers
- IUPAC name: 1-(1,3-Dichloro-6,11-dihydro-5H-dibenzo[1,2-a:1',4'-e] [7]annulen-11-yl)imidazole
- CAS Number: 128326-82-9
- PubChem CID: 72051
- ChemSpider: 65038
- UNII: V7O1U41C9B
- CompTox Dashboard (EPA): DTXSID90926104

Chemical and physical data
- Formula: C_{18}H_{14}Cl_{2}N_{2}
- Molar mass: 329.22 g·mol^{−1}
- 3D model (JSmol): Interactive image
- SMILES: C1CC2=CC(=CC(=C2C(C3=CC=CC=C31)N4C=CN=C4)Cl)Cl
- InChI: InChI=1S/C18H14Cl2N2/c19-14-9-13-6-5-12-3-1-2-4-15(12)18(17(13)16(20)10-14)22-8-7-21-11-22/h1-4,7-11,18H,5-6H2; Key:MPTJIDOGFUQSQH-UHFFFAOYSA-N

Eberconazole is an antifungal drug. As a 1% topical cream, it is an effective treatment for dermatophytosis, candidiasis, and pityriasis.

It was approved for use in Spain in 2015 and is sold under the trade name Ebernet. It is also approved for use in Panama, Guatemala, Costa Rica, Honduras, and the Dominican Republic.
