= C7H5Br3O =

The molecular formula C_{7}H_{5}Br_{3}O (molar mass: 344.83 g/mol, exact mass: 341.7891 u) may refer to:

- 2,4,6-Tribromoanisole (TBA)
- Tribromometacresol
