= Tolnaftate =

Chemical compound

Clinical data
- Trade names: Tinactin
- Other names: 2-Naphthyl N-methyl-N-(3-tolyl)thionocarbamate
- AHFS/Drugs.com: Monograph
- MedlinePlus: a682617
- ATC code: D01AE18 (WHO)

Legal status
- Legal status: In general: Over-the-counter (OTC)

Identifiers
- IUPAC name: O-2-Naphthyl methyl(3-methylphenyl)thiocarbamate
- CAS Number: 2398-96-1
- PubChem CID: 5510
- DrugBank: DB00525
- ChemSpider: 5309
- UNII: 06KB629TKV
- KEGG: D00381
- ChEBI: CHEBI:9620
- ChEMBL: ChEMBL83668
- CompTox Dashboard (EPA): DTXSID3042477
- ECHA InfoCard: 100.017.516

Chemical and physical data
- Formula: C_{19}H_{17}NOS
- Molar mass: 307.41 g·mol^{−1}
- 3D model (JSmol): Interactive image
- Melting point: 110 to 111.5 °C (230.0 to 232.7 °F)
- SMILES: S=C(Oc2ccc1c(cccc1)c2)N(c3cc(ccc3)C)C
- InChI: InChI=1S/C19H17NOS/c1-14-6-5-9-17(12-14)20(2)19(22)21-18-11-10-15-7-3-4-8-16(15)13-18/h3-13H,1-2H3; Key:FUSNMLFNXJSCDI-UHFFFAOYSA-N

Tolnaftate (INN), sold under the brand names TAGRID, and Tinactin, among others, is a synthetic thiocarbamate used as an anti-fungal agent that may be sold without medical prescription in most jurisdictions. It is supplied as a cream, powder, spray, liquid, and liquid aerosol. Tolnaftate is used to treat fungal conditions such as jock itch, athlete's foot and ringworm. Tolnaftate was discovered by Teruhisa Noguchi in 1962 while he was working for the Nippon Soda Company.

== Mechanism ==
Although the exact mechanism of action is not entirely known, it is believed to inhibit squalene epoxidase, an important enzyme in the biosynthetic pathway of ergosterol (a key component of the fungal cell membrane) in a similar way to terbinafine.

== Uses ==
Tolnaftate has been found to be generally slightly less effective than azoles when used to treat tinea pedis (athlete's foot). It is, however, useful when dealing with ringworm, especially when passed from pets to humans.

== Side effects ==
Side effects that may occur include:

- allergic reactions like:
  - skin rash
  - itching or hives
  - swelling of the face, lips, or tongue
- inflammation, redness, or pain at the affected area

Less severe side effects include:

- dry skin
- mild skin irritation, burning, or itching at the affected area

== See also ==
- Liranaftate, a similar thiocarbamate antifungal
