= Ticlatone =

Chemical compound

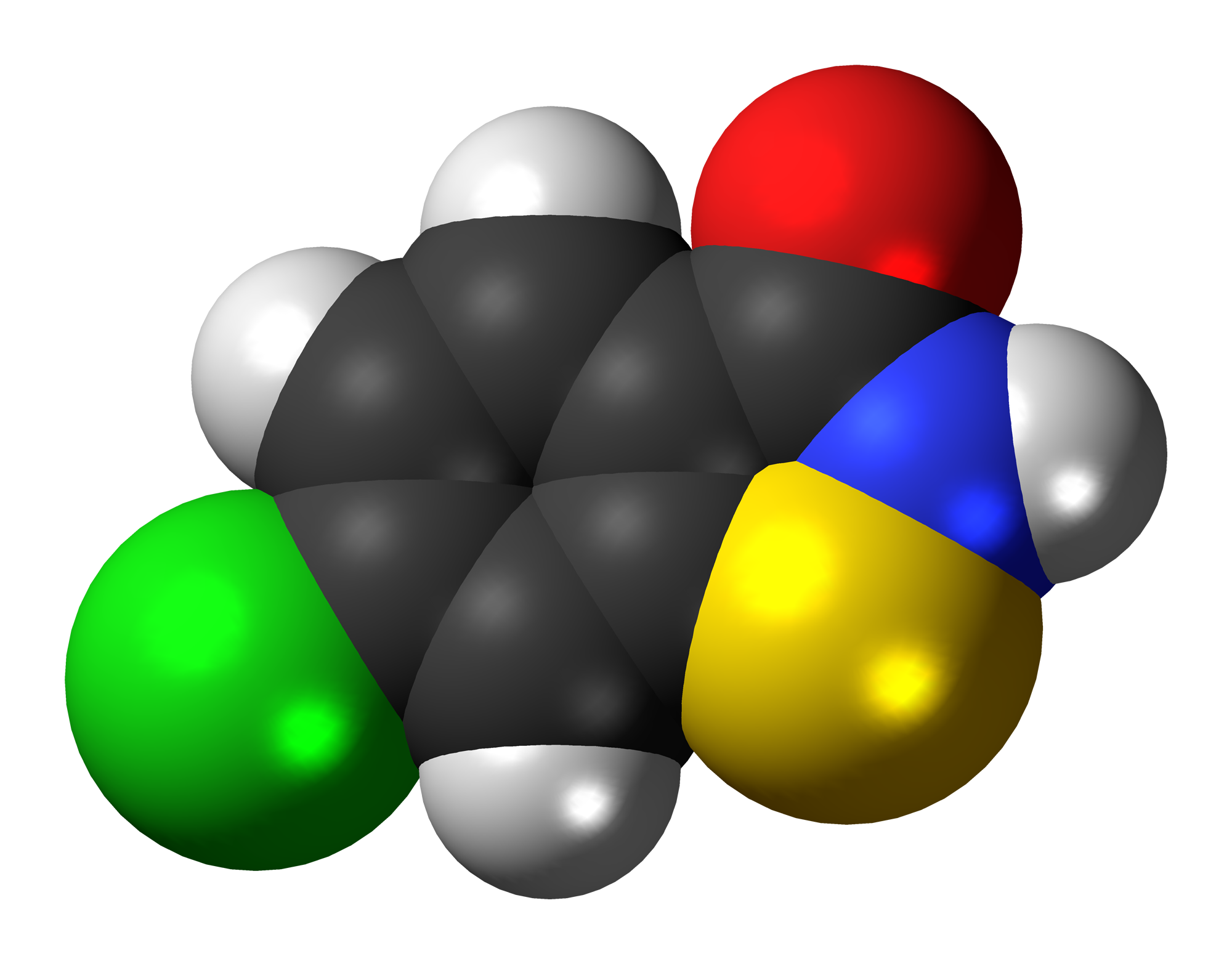

Clinical data
- Trade names: Landromil
- ATC code: D01AE08 (WHO)

Identifiers
- IUPAC name: 6-Chloro-1,2-benzothiazol-3(2H)-one
- CAS Number: 70-10-0
- PubChem CID: 6258
- ChemSpider: 6022
- UNII: BHW384Q9GI
- KEGG: D06139
- CompTox Dashboard (EPA): DTXSID8057809

Chemical and physical data
- Formula: C_{7}H_{4}ClNOS
- Molar mass: 185.63 g·mol^{−1}
- 3D model (JSmol): Interactive image
- Melting point: 270 to 273 °C (518 to 523 °F)
- SMILES: c1cc2c(cc1Cl)s[nH]c2=O
- InChI: InChI=1S/C7H4ClNOS/c8-4-1-2-5-6(3-4)11-9-7(5)10/h1-3H,(H,9,10); Key:POPOYOKQQAEISW-UHFFFAOYSA-N

Ticlatone (trade name Landromil) is an antifungal.
