= Bromochlorosalicylanilide =

Chemical compound

Clinical data
- Other names: Bromosalicylchloranilide; Multifungin; Salifungin
- ATC code: D01AE01 (WHO)

Identifiers
- IUPAC name: 5-Bromo-N-(4-chlorophenyl)-2-hydroxybenzamide
- CAS Number: 3679-64-9
- PubChem CID: 77254
- ChemSpider: 69679
- UNII: 6GK715PWMQ
- ChEMBL: ChEMBL153192
- CompTox Dashboard (EPA): DTXSID80190256
- ECHA InfoCard: 100.020.870

Chemical and physical data
- Formula: C_{13}H_{9}BrClNO_{2}
- 3D model (JSmol): Interactive image
- SMILES: Brc2cc(C(=O)Nc1ccc(Cl)cc1)c(O)cc2

Bromochlorosalicylanilide is an antifungal. It may cause allergic contact dermatitis in some individuals.
