= Protiofate =

Chemical compound

Clinical data
- ATC code: G01AX13 (WHO)

Identifiers
- IUPAC name: Dipropyl 3,4-dihydroxy-2,5-thiophenedicarboxylate
- CAS Number: 58416-00-5
- PubChem CID: 68780
- ChemSpider: 15070001
- UNII: FIP88CI9Y3
- CompTox Dashboard (EPA): DTXSID70207120

Chemical and physical data
- Formula: C_{12}H_{16}O_{6}S
- Molar mass: 288.31 g·mol^{−1}

Protiofate is a drug that has antimycotic activity and used in gynecology to treat yeast infections.
