= Tinea incognita =

Fungal skin infection caused by the presence of a topical immunosuppressive agent

- Other names: Tinea atypia
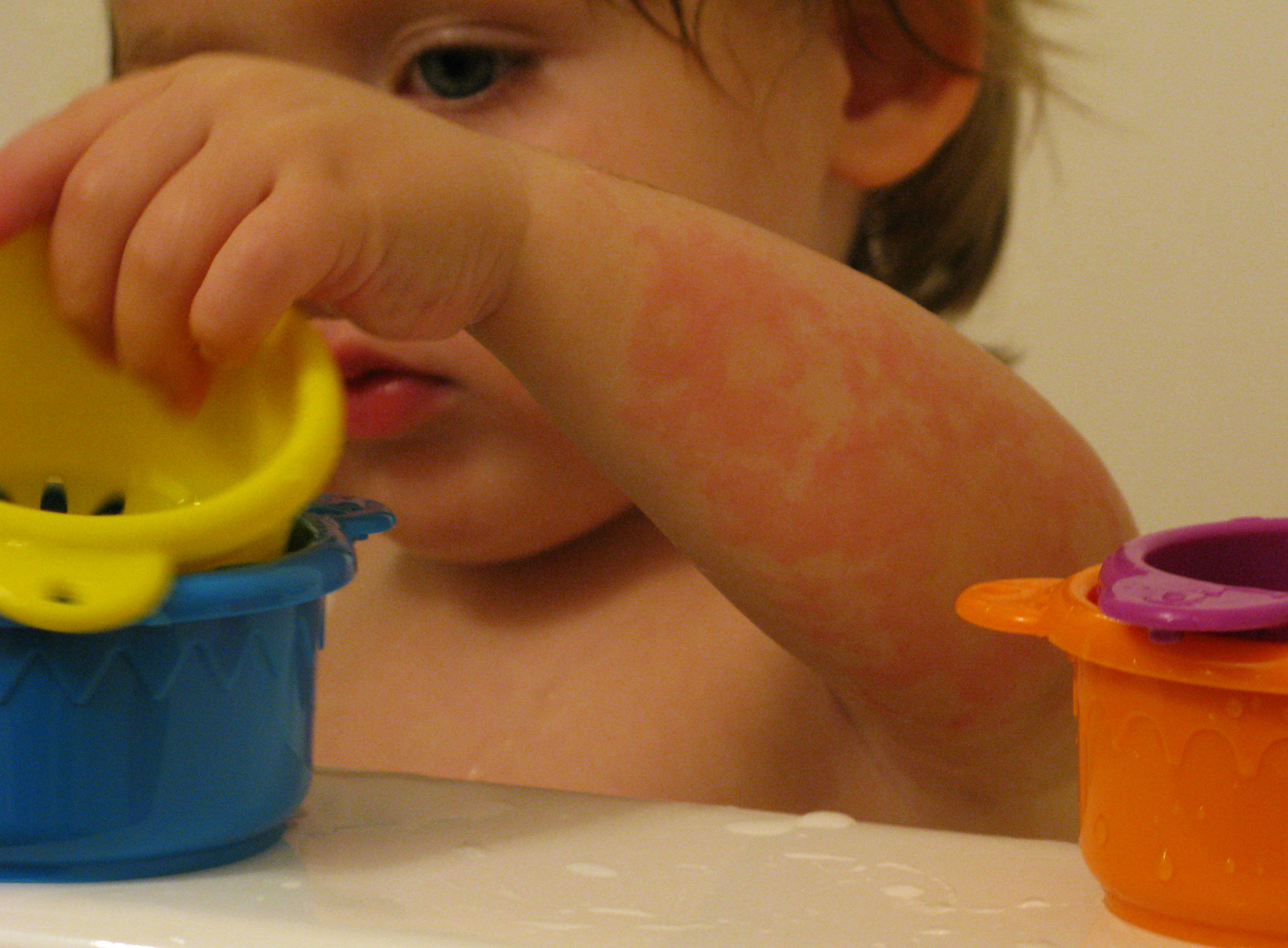
- Tinea incognita in the forearm of a child being treated for contact dermatitis
- Specialty: Dermatology

Tinea incognita, also spelled tinea incognito, is a fungal infection of the skin that generally looks odd for a typical tinea infection. (Note: Tinea incognito is a common misspelling.) The border of the skin lesion is usually blurred and it appears to have florid growth.

The condition generally occurs following the application of a steroid cream to what at first is thought to be eczema. Continued application results in expansion of the fungal infection which appears unrecognisable. Occasionally, secondary infection with bacteria occurs with concurrent pustules and impetigo.

== Cause ==
The use of a topical steroid is the most common cause. Frequently, a combination topical steroid and antifungal cream is prescribed by a physician. These combinations include betamethasone dipropionate and clotrimazole (trade name Lotrisone) and triamcinolone acetonide and clotrimazole. In areas of open skin, these combinations are acceptable in treating fungal infection of the skin. In areas where the skin is occluded (groin, buttock crease, armpit), the immunosuppression by the topical steroid might be significant enough to cause tinea incognita to occur even in the presence of an effective antifungal.

== Diagnosis ==
Clinical suspicion arises especially if the eruption is on the face, ankle, legs, or groin.

Confirmation is with a skin scraping and either fungal culture or microscopic exam with potassium hydroxide solution. Characteristic hyphae are seen running through the squamous epithelial cells.

== Treatment ==
The removal of the offending topical steroid or immunosuppressive agent and treatment with a topical antifungal is often adequate. If the tinea incognita is extensive or involves hair bearing areas, treatment with a systemic antifungal may be indicated.
