= Oxiconazole =

Chemical compound

Clinical data
- Trade names: Oxistat, Oxizole
- AHFS/Drugs.com: Monograph
- MedlinePlus: a689004
- ATC code: D01AC11 (WHO) G01AF17 (WHO)

Identifiers
- IUPAC name: (E)-[1-(2,4-Dichlorophenyl)-2-(1H-imidazol-1-yl)ethylidene][(2,4-dichlorophenyl)methoxy]amine
- CAS Number: 64211-46-7
- PubChem CID: 5361463
- DrugBank: DB00239
- ChemSpider: 4514745
- UNII: RQ8UL4C17S
- KEGG: D00885
- ChEBI: CHEBI:7825
- ChEMBL: ChEMBL1262
- CompTox Dashboard (EPA): DTXSID8040690

Chemical and physical data
- Formula: C_{18}H_{13}Cl_{4}N_{3}O
- Molar mass: 429.12 g·mol^{−1}
- 3D model (JSmol): Interactive image
- SMILES: Clc3ccc(/C(=N\OCc1ccc(Cl)cc1Cl)Cn2ccnc2)c(Cl)c3
- InChI: InChI=1S/C18H13Cl4N3O/c19-13-2-1-12(16(21)7-13)10-26-24-18(9-25-6-5-23-11-25)15-4-3-14(20)8-17(15)22/h1-8,11H,9-10H2/b24-18-; Key:QRJJEGAJXVEBNE-MOHJPFBDSA-N

Oxiconazole (trade names Oxistat in the US, Oxizole in Canada) is an antifungal medication typically administered in a cream or lotion to treat skin infections, such as athlete's foot, jock itch and ringworm. It can also be prescribed to treat the skin rash known as tinea versicolor, caused by systemic yeast overgrowth (Candida spp.).

It was patented in 1975 and approved for medical use in 1983.

== Synthesis ==

Treatment of the ketone (1) with hydroxylamine gives the oxime (2), which is alkylated with 2,4-dichlorobenzyl chloride (3) in the presence of the strong base sodium hydride to give oxiconazole.

== See also ==
- Fluconazole
