= Hachimycin =

Chemical compound

Clinical data
- ATC code: D01AA03 (WHO) G01AA06 (WHO) J02AA02 (WHO)

Identifiers
- IUPAC name: (4E,6E,8E,10E,12E,14E,16E)-3-[(2R,3S,4S,5S,6R)-4-amino-3,5-dihydroxy-6-methyloxan-2-yl]oxy-19-[7-(4-aminophenyl)-5-hydroxy-7-oxoheptan-2-yl]-25,27,31,33,35,37-hexahydroxy-18-methyl-21,23-dioxo-20,39-dioxabicyclo[33.3.1]nonatriaconta-4,6,8,10,12,14,16-heptaene-38-carboxylic acid;(4E,6E,8E,10E,12E,14E,16E)-3-[(2R,3S,4S,5S,6R)-4-amino-3,5-dihydroxy-6-methyloxan-2-yl]oxy-19-[7-(4-aminophenyl)-5-hydroxy-7-oxoheptan-2-yl]-27,29,31,33,35,37-hexahydroxy-18-methyl-21,23-dioxo-20,39-dioxabicyclo[33.3.1]nonatriaconta-4,6,8,10,12,14,16-heptaene-38-carboxylic acid
- CAS Number: 1394-02-1
- PubChem CID: 11979956
- ChemSpider: 10153168
- UNII: 7073J025LS

Chemical and physical data
- Formula: C_{116}H_{168}N_{4}O_{36}
- Molar mass: 2194.612 g·mol^{−1}
- 3D model (JSmol): Interactive image
- SMILES: CC1C=CC=CC=CC=CC=CC=CC=CC(CC2C(C(CC(O2)(CC(CC(CC(CC(CCCC(=O)CC(=O)OC1C(C)CCC(CC(=O)C3=CC=C(C=C3)N)O)O)O)O)O)O)O)C(=O)O)OC4C(C(C(C(O4)C)O)N)O.CC1C=CC=CC=CC=CC=CC=CC=CC(CC2C(C(CC(O2)(CC(CC(CCCC(CC(CC(=O)CC(=O)OC1C(C)CCC(CC(=O)C3=CC=C(C=C3)N)O)O)O)O)O)O)O)C(=O)O)OC4C(C(C(C(O4)C)O)N)O
- InChI: InChI=1S/2C58H84N2O18/c1-35-17-14-12-10-8-6-4-5-7-9-11-13-15-20-46(76-57-54(71)52(60)53(70)37(3)75-57)32-49-51(56(72)73)48(68)34-58(74,78-49)33-45(66)29-44(65)28-43(64)27-40(61)18-16-19-41(62)31-50(69)77-55(35)36(2)21-26-42(63)30-47(67)38-22-24-39(59)25-23-38;1-35-17-14-12-10-8-6-4-5-7-9-11-13-15-20-46(76-57-54(71)52(60)53(70)37(3)75-57)32-49-51(56(72)73)48(68)34-58(74,78-49)33-45(66)28-41(62)19-16-18-40(61)27-43(64)29-44(65)31-50(69)77-55(35)36(2)21-26-42(63)30-47(67)38-22-24-39(59)25-23-38/h4-15,17,20,22-25,35-37,40,42-46,48-49,51-55,57,61,63-66,68,70-71,74H,16,18-19,21,26-34,59-60H2,1-3H3,(H,72,73);4-15,17,20,22-25,35-37,40-43,45-46,48-49,51-55,57,61-64,66,68,70-71,74H,16,18-19,21,26-34,59-60H2,1-3H3,(H,72,73)/b5-4-,8-6-,9-7-,12-10-,13-11-,17-14-,20-15-;5-4+,8-6+,9-7+,12-10+,13-11+,17-14-,20-15+/t35?,36?,37-,40?,42?,43?,44?,45?,46?,48?,49?,51?,52+,53-,54+,55?,57+,58?;35?,36?,37-,40?,41?,42?,43?,45?,46?,48?,49?,51?,52+,53-,54+,55?,57+,58?/m11/s1; Key:RZWQQZWPVPHLSY-UGMBPVHXSA-N

Hachimycin, also known as trichomycin, is a polyene macrolide antibiotic, antiprotozoal, and antifungal derived from streptomyces. It was first described in 1950, and in most research cases have been used for gynecological infections.
