= Araroba powder =

Araroba powder, also known as Bahia powder and Goa powder, is a drug occurring in the form of a yellowish-brown powder, varying considerably in tint, from the Indian state of Goa, where it appears to have been introduced about the year 1852.

The tree which yields it is the Andira araroba of the family Fabaceae. It is abundant in certain forests in the province of Bahia in Brazil as well as imported into India, preferring as a rule low and humid spots. The tree ranges from 80 to 100 ft. high and has large imparipinnate, or feather shaped, leaves, the leaflets of which are oblong, about 12 in. long and 1 in. broad, and somewhat truncate at the apex. The flowers are papilionaceous, of a purple color and arranged in panicles.

The Goa powder or araroba is contained in the trunk, filling crevices in the heartwood. It is a morbid product in the tree, and yields to hot chloroform 50% of a substance known officially as chrysarobin. It occurs as a microcrystalline, odorless, tasteless powder, very slightly soluble in either water or alcohol; it also occurs in rhubarb root. This complex mixture contains pure chrysarobin, di-chrysarobin, and di-chrysarobin methylether. Chrysarobin is a methyl trioxyanthracene and exists as a glucoside in the plant, but is gradually oxidized to chrysophanic acid (a dioxy-methyl anthraquinone) and glucose. This strikes a blood-red color in alkaline solutions, and may therefore cause much alarm if administered to a patient whose urine is alkaline.

== Medicinal uses ==
Dithranol and chrysophanic acid are therapeutic substances in araroba powder that are responsible for success in treatment of psoriasis and chronic eczema. It has been used as a treatment of ringworm. Generally, when used for skin conditions, the powder is mixed into a zinc or petrolatum ointment, paste, or cream base to contain it to the treatment area. The British Pharmacopoeia lists an ointment containing one part of chrysarobin and 24 parts of benzoated lard. The drug is a weak antiparasitic.

=== Adverse effects ===
Araroba powder stains skin, hair, and clothing a deep yellow or brown, a coloration which may be removed by caustic alkali in weak solution. Both internally and externally the drug is a powerful irritant. Reported adverse effects include inflammation of the eyes, gastrointestinal tract, and kidneys. Contact allergy has also been reported.

== Pharmacology ==
=== Mechanism of Action ===
The mechanism of action of araroba powder is not yet confirmed, but is believed to affect cell turnover. Anti-inflammatory properties are also present by neutrophil and monocyte function inhibition.
