= Chlorphenesin =

Chemical preservative and topical antifungal

Names
- IUPAC name 3-(4-Chlorophenoxy)propane-1,2-diol
- Other names Chlorphenesin

Identifiers
CAS Number	104-29-0
3D model (JSmol)	Interactive image
ChEBI	CHEBI:3642
ChEMBL	ChEMBL388751
ChemSpider	7411
ECHA InfoCard	100.002.902
EC Number	203-192-6
KEGG	C07928
PubChem CID	7697
UNII	I670DAL4SZ
CompTox Dashboard (EPA)	DTXSID0049028
- InChI: InChI=1S/C9H11ClO3/c10-7-1-3-9(4-2-7)13-6-8(12)5-11/h1-4,8,11-12H,5-6H2 Key: RLLPVAHKSCTKIL-UHFFFAOYSA-N
- SMILES: C1=CC(=CC=C1OCC(CO)O)Cl

Properties
Chemical formula	C_{9}H_{11}ClO_{3}
Molar mass	202.63 g·mol^{−1}
Melting point	77 to 78 °C (171 to 172 °F; 350 to 351 K)
Solubility in water	10.4 g/L
log P	1.2

Hazards
- GHS labelling
Pictograms	(GHS05: Corrosive) (GHS07: Exclamation mark)
Signal word	Danger
Hazard statements	H302, H315, H318, H319, H332, H335
Precautionary statements	P261, P264, P264+P265, P270, P271, P280, P301+P317, P302+P352, P304+P340, P305+P351+P338, P305+P354+P338, P317, P319, P321, P330, P332+P317, P337+P317, P362+P364, P403+P233, P405, P501
- Except where otherwise noted, data are given for materials in their standard state (at 25 °C [77 °F], 100 kPa). Infobox references

Chlorphenesin is a synthetic chemical used as a preservative in certain cosmetics. Owing to its antifungal and antibacterial properties; it is classified as an antifungal for topical use by the WHO. The major adverse effect from this preservative on skin is allergic contact sensitivity. Systemic intoxication from transdermal use has not been observed, although the FDA discourages its use as an ingredient in nipple cream for nursing mothers.
