= Tribromometacresol =

Chemical compound

Clinical data
- Other names: Micatex; Triphysan; Triphysol; 2,4,6-Tribromo-m-cresol; 2,4,6-Tribromo-3-hydroxytoluene; 2,4,6-Tribromo-3-methyl-phenol
- ATC code: D01AE03 (WHO)

Identifiers
- IUPAC name: 2,4,6-Tribromo-3-methylphenol
- CAS Number: 4619-74-3
- PubChem CID: 20737
- ChemSpider: 19526
- UNII: Q3Z845166M
- CompTox Dashboard (EPA): DTXSID40196754
- ECHA InfoCard: 100.022.757

Chemical and physical data
- Formula: C_{7}H_{5}Br_{3}O
- Molar mass: 344.828 g·mol^{−1}
- 3D model (JSmol): Interactive image
- Melting point: 81.5 to 85.5 °C (178.7 to 185.9 °F)
- SMILES: Cc1c(cc(c(c1Br)O)Br)Br
- InChI: InChI=1S/C7H5Br3O/c1-3-4(8)2-5(9)7(11)6(3)10/h2,11H,1H3; Key:QKHROXOPRBWBDD-UHFFFAOYSA-N

Tribromometacresol is an antifungal medication. This compound belongs to the class of organic compounds known as meta cresols, containing a meta cresol moiety which consists of a benzene ring bearing a methyl group and a hydroxyl group at ring positions 1 and 3, respectively.
