= ATC code G01 =

ATC code G01 Gynecological antiinfectives and antiseptics is a therapeutic subgroup of the Anatomical Therapeutic Chemical Classification System, a system of alphanumeric codes developed by the World Health Organization (WHO) for the classification of drugs and other medical products. Subgroup G01 is part of the anatomical group G Genito-urinary system and sex hormones.

Codes for veterinary use (ATCvet codes) can be created by placing the letter Q in front of the human ATC code: for example, QG01. ATCvet codes without corresponding human ATC codes are cited with the leading Q in the following list.
National versions of the ATC classification may include additional codes not present in this list, which follows the WHO version.

== G01A Antiinfectives and antiseptics, excluding combinations with corticosteroids ==
=== G01AA Antibiotics ===
G01AA01 Nystatin
G01AA02 Natamycin
G01AA03 Amphotericin B
G01AA04 Candicidin
G01AA05 Chloramphenicol
G01AA06 Hachimycin
G01AA07 Oxytetracycline
G01AA08 Carfecillin
G01AA09 Mepartricin
G01AA10 Clindamycin
G01AA11 Pentamycin
G01AA51 Nystatin, combinations
QG01AA55 Chloramphenicol, combinations
QG01AA90 Tetracycline
QG01AA91 Gentamicin
QG01AA99 Antibiotics, combinations

=== G01AB Arsenic compounds ===
G01AB01 Acetarsol

=== G01AC Quinoline derivatives ===
G01AC01 Diiodohydroxyquinoline
G01AC02 Clioquinol
G01AC03 Chlorquinaldol
G01AC05 Dequalinium
G01AC06 Broxyquinoline
G01AC30 Oxyquinoline
QG01AC90 Acriflavinium chloride
QG01AC99 Combinations

=== G01AD Organic acids ===
G01AD01 Lactic acid
G01AD02 Acetic acid
G01AD03 Ascorbic acid

=== G01AE Sulfonamides ===
G01AE01 Sulfatolamide
G01AE10 Combinations of sulfonamides

=== G01AF Imidazole derivatives ===
G01AF01 Metronidazole
G01AF02 Clotrimazole
G01AF04 Miconazole
G01AF05 Econazole
G01AF06 Ornidazole
G01AF07 Isoconazole
G01AF08 Tioconazole
G01AF11 Ketoconazole
G01AF12 Fenticonazole
G01AF13 Azanidazole
G01AF14 Propenidazole
G01AF15 Butoconazole
G01AF16 Omoconazole
G01AF17 Oxiconazole
G01AF18 Flutrimazole
G01AF19 Sertaconazole
G01AF20 Combinations of imidazole derivatives
G01AF21 Tinidazole
G01AF55 Econazole, combinations

=== G01AG Triazole derivatives ===
G01AG02 Terconazole

=== G01AX Other anti-infectives and antiseptics ===
G01AX01 Clodantoin
G01AX02 Inosine
G01AX03 Policresulen
G01AX05 Nifuratel
G01AX06 Furazolidone
G01AX09 Methylrosaniline
G01AX11 Povidone-iodine
G01AX12 Ciclopirox
G01AX13 Protiofate
G01AX14 Lactobacillus
G01AX15 Copper usnate
G01AX16 Hexetidine
G01AX17 Dapivirine
G01AX66 Octenidine, combinations
QG01AX90 Nitrofural
QG01AX99 Other antiinfectives and antiseptics, combinations
