= Chlorophetanol =

Antifungal

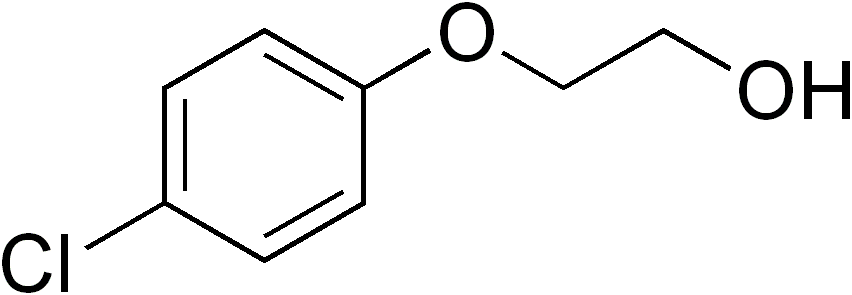

Clinical data
- ATC code: D01AE06 (WHO)

Identifiers
- IUPAC name: 2-(4-chlorophenoxy)ethanol
- CAS Number: 1892-43-9
- PubChem CID: 15907
- ChemSpider: 15118
- UNII: Q73I5T98DA
- CompTox Dashboard (EPA): DTXSID1062047
- ECHA InfoCard: 100.015.981

Chemical and physical data
- Formula: C_{8}H_{9}ClO_{2}
- Molar mass: 172.61 g·mol^{−1}
- 3D model (JSmol): Interactive image
- SMILES: Clc1ccc(OCCO)cc1
- InChI: InChI=1S/C8H9ClO2/c9-7-1-3-8(4-2-7)11-6-5-10/h1-4,10H,5-6H2; Key:GEGSSUSEWOHAFE-UHFFFAOYSA-N

Chlorophetanol is an antifungal.
