= Albaconazole =

Chemical compound

Clinical data
- ATC code: none

Identifiers
- IUPAC name: 7-Chloro-3-[(2R,3R)-3-(2,4-difluorophenyl)-3-hydroxy-4-(1,2,4-triazol-1-yl)butan-2-yl]quinazolin-4-one
- CAS Number: 187949-02-6
- PubChem CID: 208952
- DrugBank: DB12073
- ChemSpider: 181045
- UNII: YDW24Y8IAB
- KEGG: D09702
- ChEMBL: ChEMBL298817
- CompTox Dashboard (EPA): DTXSID3058244
- ECHA InfoCard: 100.170.829

Chemical and physical data
- Formula: C_{20}H_{16}ClF_{2}N_{5}O_{2}
- Molar mass: 431.83 g·mol^{−1}
- 3D model (JSmol): Interactive image
- SMILES: Fc1ccc(c(F)c1)[C@](O)([C@H](N3\C=N/c2cc(Cl)ccc2C3=O)C)Cn4ncnc4
- InChI: InChI=1S/C20H16ClF2N5O2/c1-12(28-11-25-18-6-13(21)2-4-15(18)19(28)29)20(30,8-27-10-24-9-26-27)16-5-3-14(22)7-17(16)23/h2-7,9-12,30H,8H2,1H3/t12-,20-/m1/s1; Key:UHIXWHUVLCAJQL-MPBGBICISA-N

Albaconazole (development code UR-9825) is an experimental triazole antifungal. It has potential broad-spectrum activity. The drug blocks a number of CYP450 liver enzymes.

It has also been studied as an antiprotozoal agent.
