= Clotrimazole =

Chemical compound

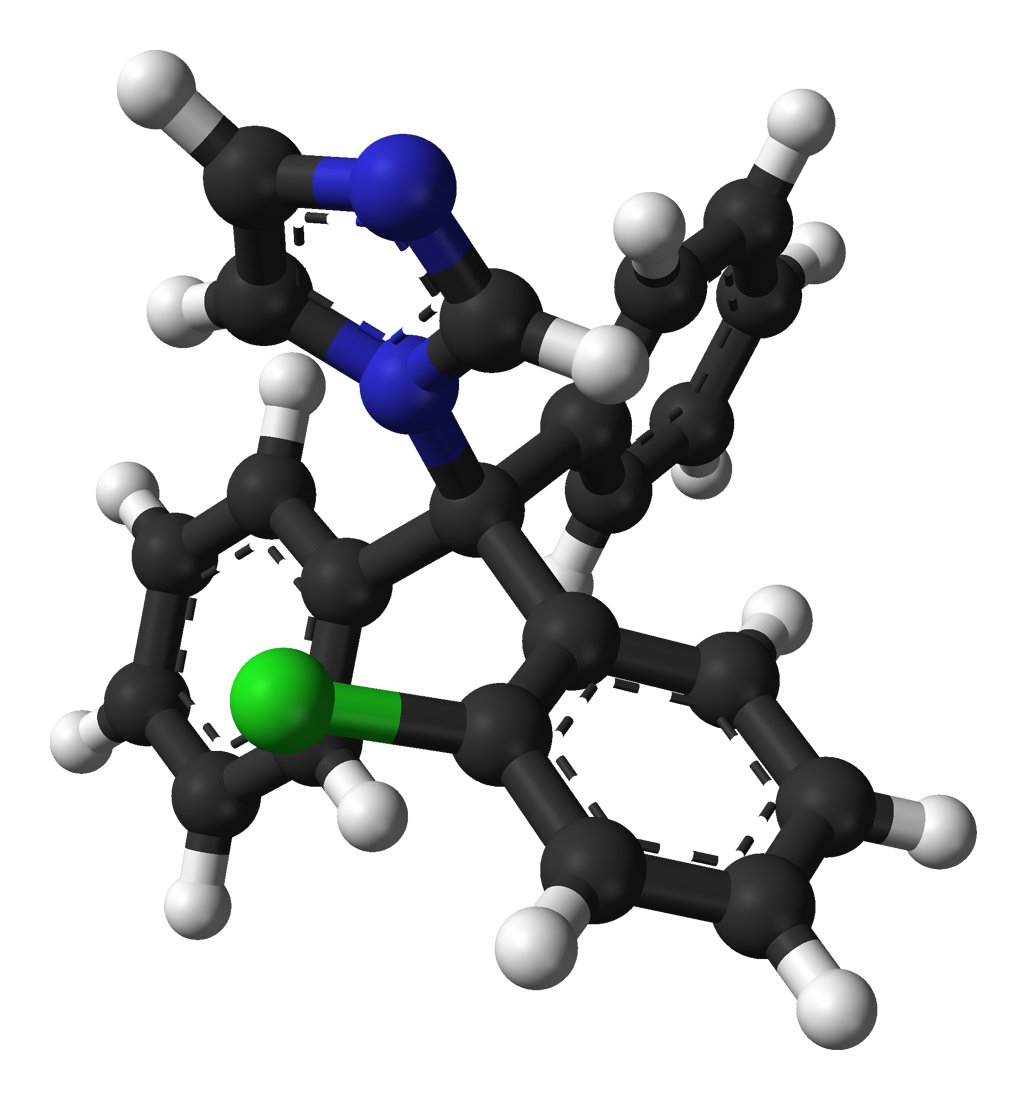

Clinical data
- Trade names: Canesten, Lotrimin, others
- AHFS/Drugs.com: Monograph
- MedlinePlus: a682753
- License data: US DailyMed: Clotrimazole
- Pregnancy category: AU: A
- Routes of administration: Topical, throat lozenge
- ATC code: A01AB18 (WHO) D01AC01 (WHO) G01AF02 (WHO) QJ02AB90 (WHO)

Legal status
- Legal status: CA: OTC; US: OTC (topical), Rx-only (by mouth)

Pharmacokinetic data
- Bioavailability: Poor absorption by mouth (lozenge), negligible absorption through intact skin (topical)
- Protein binding: 90%
- Metabolism: Liver
- Elimination half-life: 2 hours

Identifiers
- IUPAC name: 1-[(2-Chlorophenyl)(diphenyl)methyl]-1H-imidazole
- CAS Number: 23593-75-1
- PubChem CID: 2812
- IUPHAR/BPS: 2330
- DrugBank: DB00257
- ChemSpider: 2710
- UNII: G07GZ97H65
- KEGG: D00282
- ChEBI: CHEBI:3764
- ChEMBL: ChEMBL104
- CompTox Dashboard (EPA): DTXSID7029871
- ECHA InfoCard: 100.041.589

Chemical and physical data
- Formula: C_{22}H_{17}ClN_{2}
- Molar mass: 344.84 g·mol^{−1}
- 3D model (JSmol): Interactive image
- Melting point: 147 to 149 °C (297 to 300 °F)
- SMILES: Clc1ccccc1C(c2ccccc2)(c3ccccc3)n4ccnc4
- InChI: InChI=1S/C22H17ClN2/c23-21-14-8-7-13-20(21)22(25-16-15-24-17-25,18-9-3-1-4-10-18)19-11-5-2-6-12-19/h1-17H; Key:VNFPBHJOKIVQEB-UHFFFAOYSA-N

Clotrimazole, sold under the brand name Canesten or Lotrimin, among others, is an antifungal medication. It is used to treat vaginal yeast infections, oral thrush, diaper rash, tinea versicolor, and types of ringworm including athlete's foot and jock itch. It is in the azole class of medications and works by disrupting the fungal cell membrane. It can be taken by mouth or applied as a cream to the skin or in the vagina.

Common side effects of clotrimazole taken by mouth include nausea and itchiness. When it is applied to the skin, common side effects include redness and a burning sensation. In pregnancy, topical use, even in the vagina, is believed to be safe, nor is there evidence of harm by oral use, but the latter has been less well studied.

Clotrimazole, originally known as BAY b 5097, was discovered in 1969. It is on the World Health Organization's List of Essential Medicines. It is available as a generic medication. In 2023, it was the 259th most commonly prescribed medication in the United States, with more than 1 million prescriptions.

== Medical uses ==
It is available without a prescription in various dosage forms, such as a topical cream, ointment, or vaginal suppository.

An effective treatment option for mixed infectious vaginitis is a combination of clotrimazole and metronidazole.

Topical clotrimazole is usually not effective in the treatment of fungal infections of the scalp or nails; however, when combined with mechanical reduction of the nail, topical clotrimazole cream has been demonstrated to be effective in the treatment of onychomycosis.

Throat lozenge preparations are used for oropharyngeal candidiasis (oral thrush) or prevention of oral thrush in people with neutropenia.

Clotrimazole may be compounded with a glucocorticoid, such as betamethasone, in a topical cream for the treatment of tinea corporis (ringworm), tinea cruris (jock itch), and tinea pedis (athlete's foot). Although temporary relief and partial suppression of symptoms may be observed with the combination therapy, glucocorticoids can elicit an immunosuppressive response and rebound effect that results in more severe infection typically requiring systemic antifungal agents to treat the disease. Combination creams are best avoided to improve treatment outcomes, reduce the possibility of skin atrophy associated with prolonged topical glucocorticoid use, and limit the cost of treatment. It can be effective in treating chronic paronychia. The preferred treatment of tinea infections is therefore clotrimazole monotherapy.

Additionally, clotrimazole may be used to treat the sickling of cells (related to sickle cell anemia).

=== Pregnancy ===
Small amounts of clotrimazole may be absorbed systemically following topical and vaginal administration. However, topical clotrimazole is still considered safe to use to treat yeast infections in pregnant women and is a safer alternative to other antifungals.

== Side effects ==
Side effects of the oral formulation include itching, nausea, and vomiting. Less than 10% of patients using the oral formulation may have abnormal liver function tests. Side effects include rash, hives, blisters, burning, itching, peeling, redness, swelling, pain, or other signs of skin irritation. For this reason, liver function tests should be monitored periodically when taking oral clotrimazole (troche). When used to treat vulvovaginal candidiasis (yeast infection), less than 10% of patients have vulvar or vaginal burning sensation. Less than 1% of patients have the following side effects: burning or itching of the penis of a sexual partner; polyuria; vulvar itching, soreness, edema, or discharge.

Clotrimazole creams and suppositories contain oil which may weaken latex condoms and diaphragms.

== Interactions ==
There are no known significant drug interactions with topical clotrimazole.

== Pharmacology ==
=== Pharmacodynamics ===
Clotrimazole is an imidazole derivative that works by inhibiting the growth of individual Candida or fungal cells by altering the permeability of the fungal cell wall. The drug impairs the biosynthesis of ergosterol, a critical component of the fungal cell membrane, by inhibiting the P450 enzyme lanosterol 14-alpha demethylase. Clotrimazole may slow fungal growth or result in fungal cell death.

== Society and culture ==
=== Economics ===
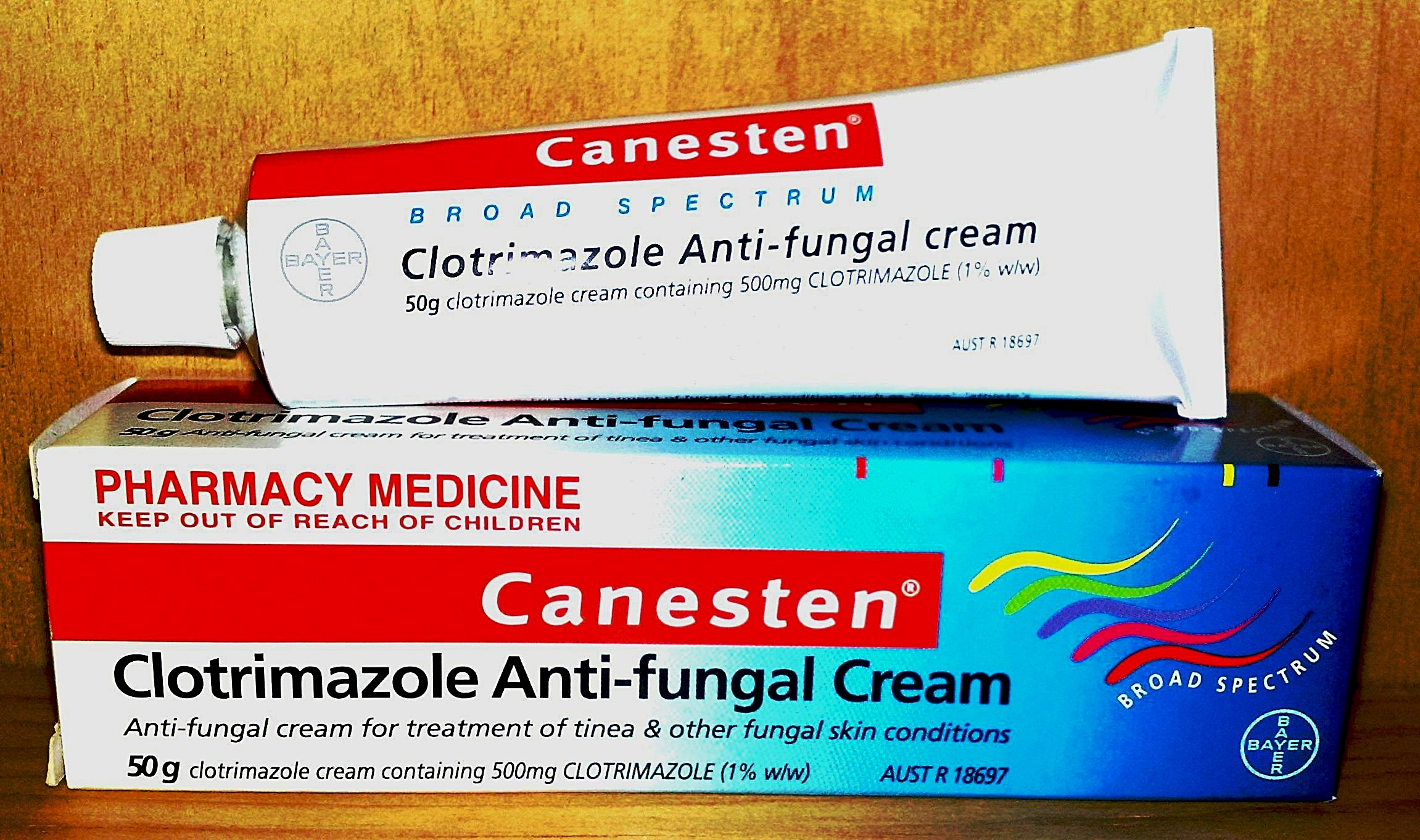
Canesten brand Clotrimazole antifungal cream

Clotrimazole is available as a generic medication, and in 2016, Canesten brand clotrimazole was one of the biggest-selling branded over-the-counter medications sold in Great Britain, with sales of £39.2 million.
