= Candidal intertrigo =

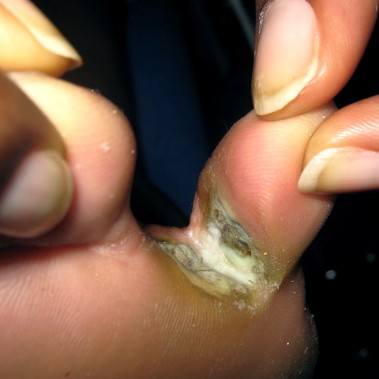
- Intertrigo interdigital
- Specialty: Infectious diseases

Candidal intertrigo is an infection of the skin by Candida albicans, more specifically located between intertriginous folds of adjacent skin.

== See also ==
- Candidiasis
- Intertrigo
- Skin lesion
