= Bifonazole =

Chemical compound

Clinical data
- Trade names: Canespor, many others
- AHFS/Drugs.com: International Drug Names
- Routes of administration: Topical
- ATC code: D01AC10 (WHO)

Legal status
- Legal status: AU: S4 (Prescription only) / Schedule 2

Identifiers
- IUPAC name: (RS)-1-[Phenyl(4-phenylphenyl)methyl]-1H-imidazole
- CAS Number: 60628-96-8
- PubChem CID: 2378
- DrugBank: DB04794
- ChemSpider: 2287
- UNII: QYJ305Z91O
- KEGG: D01775
- ChEBI: CHEBI:31286
- ChEMBL: ChEMBL277535
- CompTox Dashboard (EPA): DTXSID9045631
- ECHA InfoCard: 100.056.651

Chemical and physical data
- Formula: C_{22}H_{18}N_{2}
- Molar mass: 310.400 g·mol^{−1}
- 3D model (JSmol): Interactive image
- Chirality: Racemic mixture
- SMILES: n1ccn(c1)C(c3ccc(c2ccccc2)cc3)c4ccccc4
- InChI: InChI=1S/C22H18N2/c1-3-7-18(8-4-1)19-11-13-21(14-12-19)22(24-16-15-23-17-24)20-9-5-2-6-10-20/h1-17,22H; Key:OCAPBUJLXMYKEJ-UHFFFAOYSA-N

Bifonazole (trade name Canespor among others) is an imidazole antifungal drug used in form of ointments.

It was patented in 1974 and approved for medical use in 1983. There are also combinations with carbamide for the treatment of onychomycosis.

== Adverse effects ==
The most common side effect is a burning sensation at the application site. Other reactions, such as itching, eczema or skin dryness, are rare. Bifonazole is a potent aromatase inhibitor in vitro.

== Pharmacology ==
=== Mechanism of action ===
Bifonazole has a dual mode of action. It inhibits fungal ergosterol biosynthesis at two points, via transformation of 24-methylendihydrolanosterol to desmethylsterol, together with inhibition of HMG-CoA. This enables fungicidal properties against dermatophytes and distinguishes bifonazole from other antifungal drugs.

=== Pharmacokinetics ===
Six hours after application, bifonazole concentrations range from 1000 μg/cm^{3} in the stratum corneum to 5 μg/cm^{3} in the papillary dermis.

== Synthesis ==

Friedel-Crafts acylation between biphenyl (1) and benzoyl chloride (2) gives 4-phenylbenzophenone (3). Reduction with sodium borohydride gives the alcohol (4). Halogenation by thionyl chloride gives (5). Amination with imidazole (6) completes the synthesis of bifonazole.
