= Acrisorcin =

Chemical compound

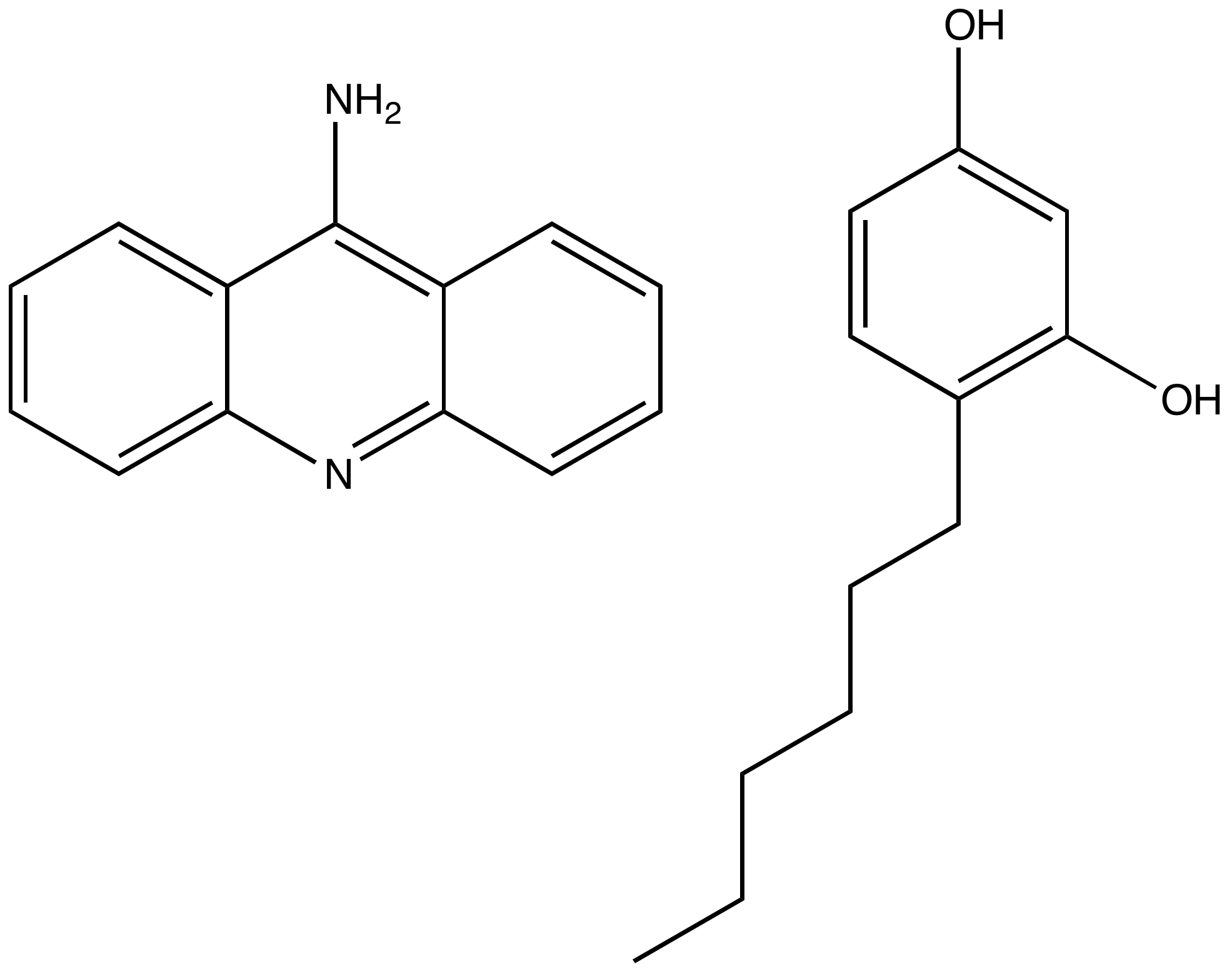

Combination of
- 9-Aminoacridine: Antiseptic
- 4-Hexylresorcinol: Antiseptic

Clinical data
- ATC code: none

Identifiers
- CAS Number: 7527-91-5
- PubChem CID: 24144
- ChemSpider: 22568
- UNII: 2U918O4BEV
- KEGG: D02759
- ChEMBL: ChEMBL1201038
- CompTox Dashboard (EPA): DTXSID10226234
- ECHA InfoCard: 100.028.536

Acrisorcin is a topical anti-infective typically used as a fungicide. It is a combination of the active ingredients 9-aminoacridine and 4-hexylresorcinol.

== History ==
Acrisorcin was marketed as a cream under the trade name Akrinol, which has since been discontinued. It was developed at Indiana State University in 1961.

== Indications ==
Acrisorcin was used to combat pityriasis versicolor.
