= Epoxiconazole =

Fungicide

Names
- IUPAC name (2RS,3SR)-1-[3-(2-chlorophenyl)-2,3-epoxy-2-(4-fluorophenyl)propyl]-1H-1,2,4-triazole

Identifiers
CAS Number	135319-73-2
3D model (JSmol)	Interactive image
ChEBI	CHEBI:4811; CHEBI:83761 2R,3S; CHEBI:83759 2S,3R
ChemSpider	24751862
ECHA InfoCard	100.100.840
KEGG	C11229
PubChem CID	3317081
UNII	FC89KM2VS3
CompTox Dashboard (EPA)	DTXSID1040372
- InChI: InChI=1S/2C17H13ClFN3O/c2*18-15-4-2-1-3-14(15)16-17(23-16,9-22-11-20-10-21-22)12-5-7-13(19)8-6-12/h2*1-8,10-11,16H,9H2/t2*16-,17-/m10/s1 Key: FEVYAAHIKWPJNV-TYDMEHBZSA-N
- SMILES: Clc1ccccc1C2OC2(Cn3cncn3)c4ccc(F)cc4

Properties
Chemical formula	C_{17}H_{13}ClFN_{3}O
Molar mass	329.76 g mol
Density	1.374 g/cm^{3}
Melting point	134 °C (273 °F; 407 K)
Solubility in water	8.42 ppm, at 20°C in water
- Except where otherwise noted, data are given for materials in their standard state (at 25 °C [77 °F], 100 kPa). verify (what is ?) Infobox references

Epoxiconazole is a fungicide active ingredient from the class of azoles developed to protect crops. In particular, the substance inhibits the metabolism of fungi cells infesting useful plants, and thereby prevents the growth of the mycelia (fungal cells). Epoxiconazole also limits the production of conidia (mitospores). Epoxiconazole was introduced to the market by BASF SE in 1993 and can be found in many products and product mixtures targeting a large number of pathogens in various crops. Crops are, for example, cereals (mainly wheat, barley, rye and triticale), soybeans, banana, rice, coffee, turnips, and red as well as sugar beets.

== Use ==
Epoxiconazole is used against, amongst others, cereal diseases, two of which, namely leaf blotch (Septoria tritici) and rust (Puccinia triticina), are responsible for up to 30% yield losses. Although not used commercially for insect control, epoxiconazole exhibits a strong anti-feeding effect on the keratin-digesting common clothes moth larvae Tineola bisselliella.

== Resistance ==
Certain plant pathogens develop resistance to fungicides. In contrast to the relatively rapid development of resistance to strobilurins, azole fungicides like Epoxiconazole have maintained their effectiveness controlling key wheat diseases for over two decades. According to a study conducted by the Home Grown Cereals Authority (HGCA), Epoxiconazole was one of two triazole fungicides (the other being prothioconazole) reported to still provide a high level of eradicative and protective control of Septoria tritici. Additional classes of fungicides like contact fungicides, strobilurins or carboxamides are available to farmers. In the latter case, the best activity rates are achieved in mixtures with triazoles.

== Mode of Action ==
As an azole, Epoxiconazole, actively stops the production of new fungi spores and inhibits the biosynthesis of existing hostile cells. Epoxiconazole works as an eradicant by encapsulating fungal haustoria, which are then cut off from their nutrient supply and therefore die. Some fungicide interactions can actually lead to increased production of mycotoxins, which are normal metabolic products of fungi, and it has been found that the inclusion of triazoles, like Epoxiconazole, in the fungicide mix may be necessary to limit mycotoxin levels.

== Regulation ==
In Europe, the active substance epoxiconazole has been withdrawn by industry from the approval process under Regulation (EC) No 1107/2009. The effect of that withdrawal is that epoxiconazole is banned from all use in the category ‘pesticides’, due to the fact that it has not been approved for any other use in that category.

In addition, the harmonised classification of epoxiconazole under Regulation (EC) No 1272/2008 of the European Parliament and of the Council is sufficient evidence that the substance raises concerns for human health and the environment.

According to the European Chemicals Agency, Epoxiconazole is very toxic to aquatic life with long lasting effects, may damage fertility or the unborn child, and is suspected of causing cancer.
