= Tinea cruris =

Fungal infection

- Other names: Eczema marginatum, dhobi itch, gym itch, jock itch, scrotum itch
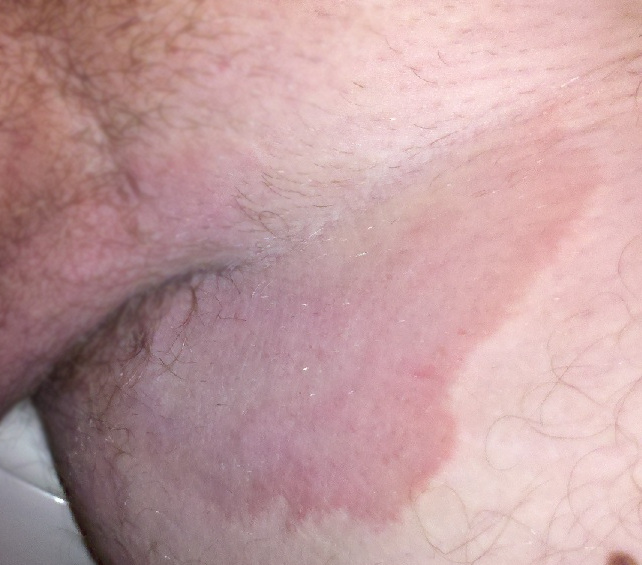
- Tinea cruris on the groin of a man
- Specialty: Dermatology
- Symptoms: Itch, rash in groin
- Risk factors: Excessive sweating; Diabetes; Obesity
- Diagnostic method: Microscopy and culture of skin scrapings
- Differential diagnosis: Candidal intertrigo; Erythrasma; Inverse psoriasis; Seborrhoeic dermatitis
- Prevention: Treat any fungal infections of feet or nails; Keep groin region dry; Avoid tight clothing; Lose weight if obese
- Medication: Topical antifungal medications

Tinea cruris (TC), also known as jock itch, is a common type of contagious, superficial fungal infection of the groin and buttocks region, which occurs predominantly but not exclusively in men and in hot-humid climates.

Typically, over the upper inner thighs, there is an intensely itchy red raised rash with a scaly well-defined curved border. It is often associated with athlete's foot and fungal nail infections, excessive sweating, and sharing of infected towels or sports clothing. It is uncommon in children.

Its appearance may be similar to some other rashes that occur in skin folds including candidal intertrigo, erythrasma, inverse psoriasis and seborrhoeic dermatitis. Tests may include microscopy and culture of skin scrapings.

Treatment is with topical antifungal medications and is particularly effective if symptoms have recent onset. Prevention of recurrences include treating concurrent fungal infections and taking measures to avoid moisture build-up including keeping the groin region dry, avoiding tight clothing and losing weight if obese.

== Names ==
Other names include "jock itch", "dhobi itch", "scrotum itch", "gym itch", "ringworm of groin" and "eczema marginatum".

== Signs and symptoms ==
Typically, over the upper inner thighs, there is a red raised rash with a scaly well-defined border. There may be some blistering and weeping, and the rash can reach near to the anus. The distribution is usually on both sides of the groin and the center may be lighter in colour. The rash may appear reddish, tan, or brown, with flaking, rippling, peeling, iridescence, or cracking skin.

If the person is hairy, hair follicles can become inflamed resulting in some bumps (papules, nodules and pustules) within the plaque. The plaque may reach the scrotum in men and the labia majora and mons pubis in women. The penis is usually unaffected unless there is immunodeficiency or there has been use of steroids.

Affected people usually experience intense itching in the groin which can extend to the anus.

== Causes ==
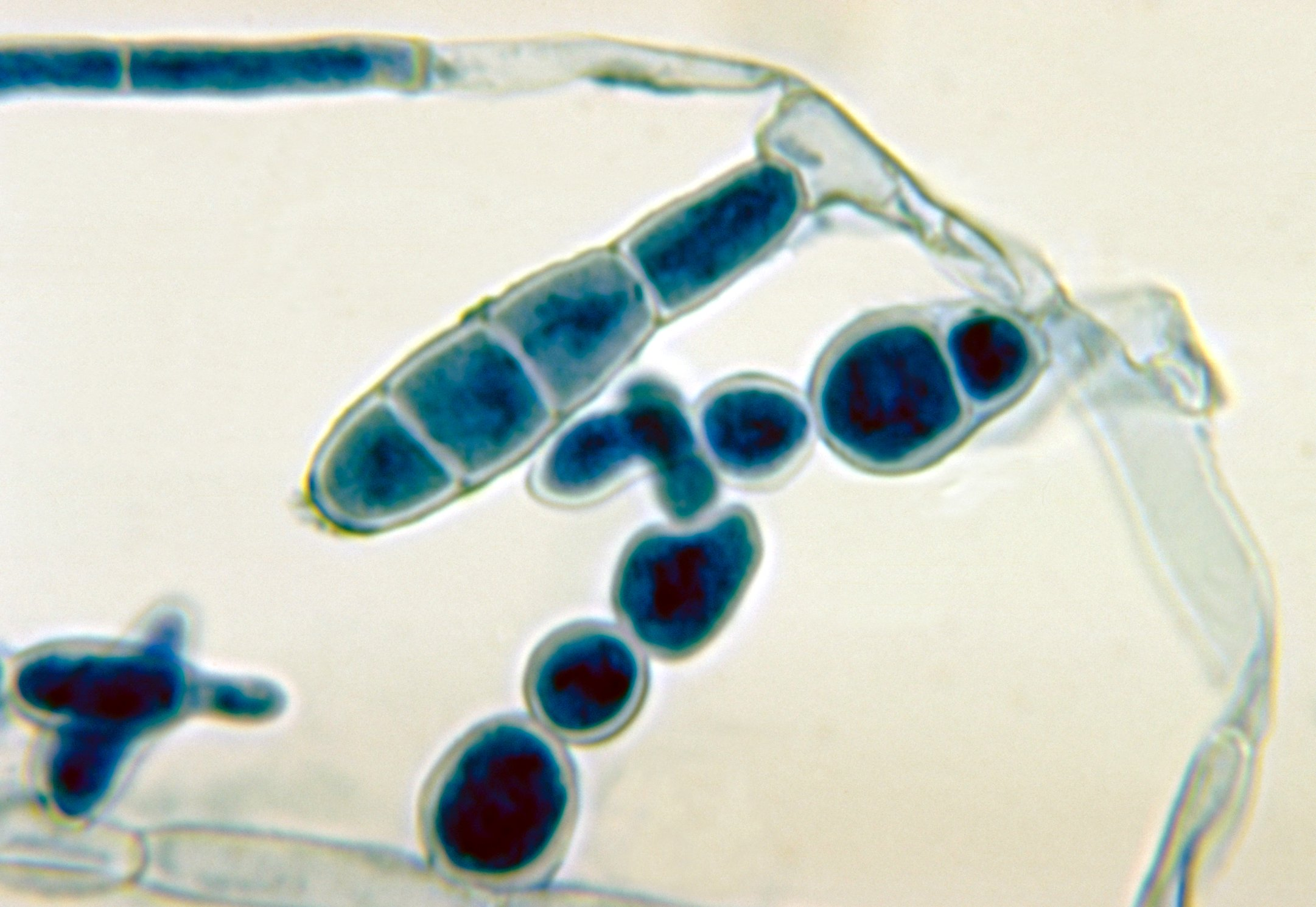
Macroconidia from Epidermophyton floccosum

Tinea cruris is often associated with athlete's foot and fungal nail infections. Rubbing from clothing, excessive sweating, diabetes and obesity are risk factors. It is contagious and can be transmitted person-to-person by skin-to-skin contact or by contact with contaminated sports clothing and sharing towels.

The type of fungus involved may vary in different parts of the world; for example, Trichophyton rubrum and Epidermophyton floccosum are common in New Zealand. Less commonly Trichophyton mentagrophytes and Trichophyton verrucosum are involved. Trichophyton interdigitale has also been implicated.

== Diagnosis ==
Tests are usually not needed to make a diagnosis, but if required, may include microscopy and culture of skin scrapings, a KOH examination to check for fungus, or skin biopsy.

=== Differential diagnosis ===
The symptoms of tinea cruris may be similar to other causes of itch in the groin. Its appearance may be similar to some other rashes that occur in skin folds including candidal intertrigo, erythrasma, inverse psoriasis and seborrhoeic dermatitis.

== Prevention ==
To prevent recurrences of tinea cruris, concurrent fungal infections such as athlete's foot need to be treated. Also advised are measures to avoid moisture build-up including keeping the groin region dry, avoiding tight clothing, and losing weight if obese. People with athlete's foot or tinea cruris can prevent spread by not lending their towels to others.

== Treatment ==
Tinea cruris is treated by applying antifungal medications of the allylamine or azole type to the groin region. Studies suggest that allylamines (naftifine and terbinafine) are a quicker but more expensive form of treatment compared to azoles (clotrimazole, econazole, ketoconazole, oxiconazole, sulconazole). If the symptoms have been present for long or the condition worsens despite applying creams, terbinafine or itraconazole can be given by mouth.

The benefits of the use of topical steroids in addition to an antifungal are unclear. There might be a greater cure rate but no guidelines currently recommend its addition. The effect of Whitfield's ointment is also unclear, but when given, it is prescribed at half strength.

Wearing cotton underwear and socks, in addition to keeping the groin dry and using antifungal powders, is helpful.

== Prognosis ==
Tinea cruris is not life-threatening and treatment is effective, particularly if the symptoms have not been present for long. However, recurrence may occur. The intense itch may lead to lichenification and secondary bacterial infection. Irritant and allergic contact dermatitis may be caused by applied medications.

== Epidemiology ==
Tinea cruris is common in hot-humid climates, and is the second most common clinical presentation for dermatophytosis. It is uncommon in children.
