= Fungistatics =

Fungistatics are anti-fungal agents that inhibit the growth of fungus (without killing the fungus). The term fungistatic may be used as both a noun and an adjective. Fungistatics have applications in agriculture, the food industry, the paint industry, and medicine.

== Anti-fungal medicines ==
Fluconazole is a fungistatic antifungal medication that is administered orally or intravenously. It is used to treat a variety of fungal infections, especially Candida infections of the vagina ("yeast infections"), mouth, throat, and bloodstream. It is also used to prevent infections in people with weak immune systems, including those with neutropenia due to cancer chemotherapy, transplant patients, and premature babies. Its mechanism of action involves interfering with synthesis of the fungal cell membrane.

Itraconazole (R51211), invented in 1984, is a triazole fungistatic antifungal agent prescribed to patients with fungal infections. The drug may be given orally or intravenously. Itraconazole has a broader spectrum of activity than fluconazole (but not as broad as voriconazole or posaconazole). In particular, it is active against Aspergillus, which fluconazole is not. The mechanism of action of itraconazole is the same as the other azole antifungals: it inhibits the fungal-mediated synthesis of ergosterol.

== Anti-fungal food preservatives ==
Sodium benzoate and potassium sorbate are both examples of fungistatic substances that are widely used in the preservation of food and beverages.

== See also ==
- Fungicide – the other type of anti-fungal agents are fungicidal agents (fungicides)
