= Antifungal =

Pharmaceutical fungicide or fungistatic used to treat and prevent mycosis

- Drug class
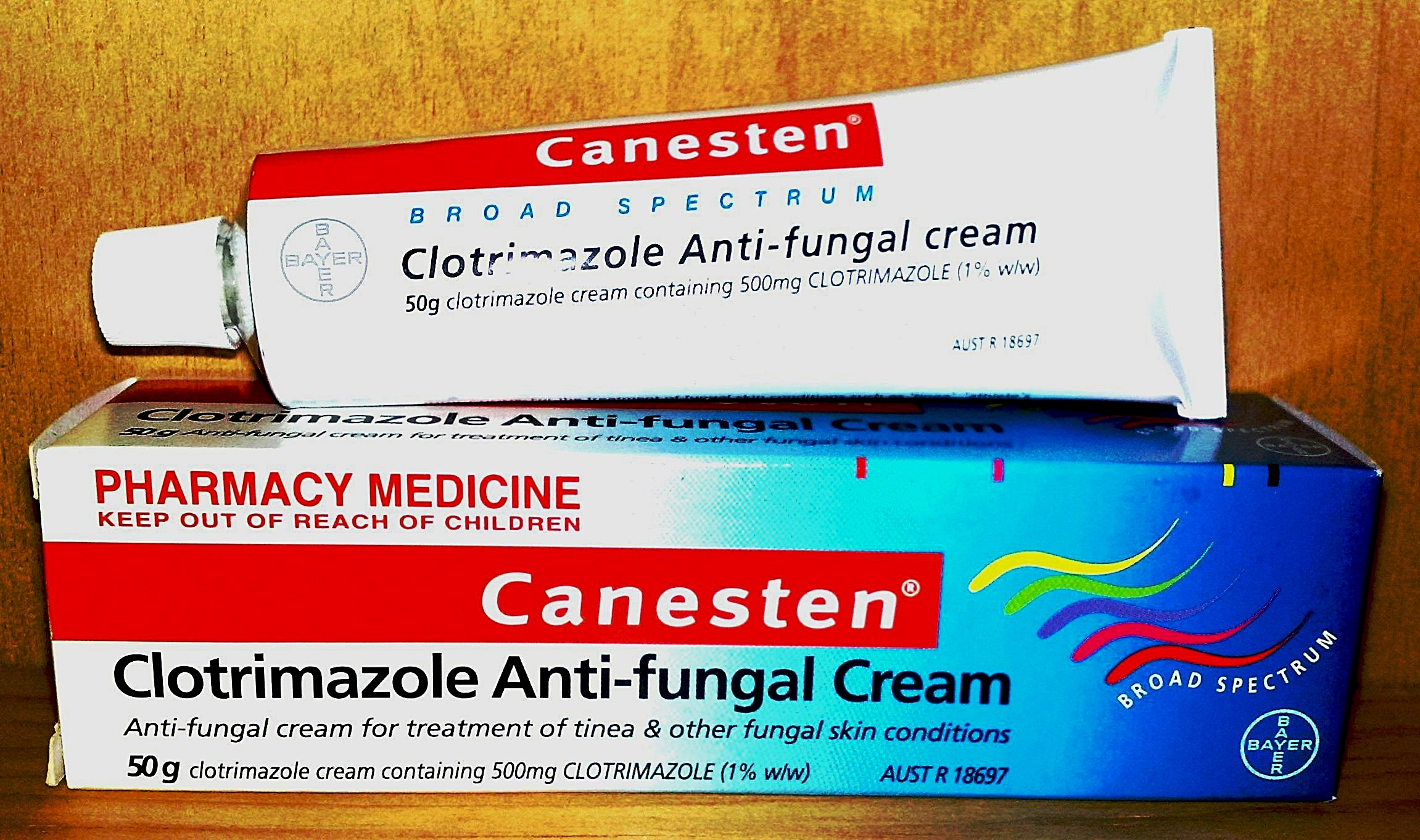
- Canesten (clotrimazole) antifungal cream
- Synonyms: antimycotic medication

Legal status

An antifungal medication, also known as an antimycotic medication, is a pharmaceutical fungicide or fungistatic used to treat and prevent mycosis such as athlete's foot, ringworm, candidiasis (thrush), serious systemic infections such as cryptococcal meningitis, and others. Such drugs are usually obtained by a doctor's prescription, but a few are available over the counter (OTC). The evolution of antifungal resistance is a growing threat to health globally.

== Routes of administration ==
=== Ocular ===
Indicated when the fungal infection is located in the eye. There is currently only one ocular antifungal available: natamycin. However, various other antifungal agents could be compounded in this formulation.

=== Intrathecal ===
Used occasionally when there's an infection of the central nervous system and other systemic options cannot reach the concentration required in that region for therapeutic benefit. Example(s): amphotericin B.

=== Vaginal ===
This may be used to treat some fungal infections of the vaginal region. An example of a condition they are sometimes used for is candida vulvovaginitis which is treated with intravaginal Clotrimazole.

=== Topical ===
This is sometimes indicated when there's a fungal infection on the skin. An example is tinea pedis; this is sometimes treated with topical terbinafine.

=== Oral ===
If the antifungal has good bioavailability, this is a common route to handle a fungal infection. An example is the use of ketoconazole to treat coccidioidomycosis.

=== Intravenous ===
Like the oral route, this will reach the bloodstream and distribute throughout the body. However, it is faster and a good option if the drug has poor bioavailability. An example of this is IV amphotericin B for the treatment of coccidioidomycosis.

== Classes ==
The available classes of antifungal drugs are still limited but as of 2021 novel classes of antifungals are being developed and are undergoing various stages of clinical trials to assess performance.

=== Polyenes ===
A polyene is a molecule with multiple conjugated double bonds. A polyene antifungal is a macrocyclic polyene with a heavily hydroxylated region on the ring opposite the conjugated system. This makes polyene antifungals amphiphilic. The polyene antimycotics bind with sterols in the fungal cell membrane, principally ergosterol. This changes the transition temperature (Tg) of the cell membrane, thereby placing the membrane in a less fluid, more crystalline state. (In ordinary circumstances membrane sterols increase the packing of the phospholipid bilayer making the plasma membrane more dense.) As a result, the cell's contents including monovalent ions (K^{+}, Na^{+}, H^{+}, and Cl^{−}) and small organic molecules leak, which is regarded as one of the primary ways a cell dies. Animal cells contain cholesterol instead of ergosterol and so they are much less susceptible. However, at therapeutic doses, some amphotericin B may bind to animal membrane cholesterol, increasing the risk of human toxicity. Amphotericin B is nephrotoxic when given intravenously. As a polyene's hydrophobic chain is shortened, its sterol binding activity is increased. Therefore, further reduction of the hydrophobic chain may result in it binding to cholesterol, making it toxic to animals.

- Amphotericin B
- Candicidin
- Filipin – 35 carbons, binds to cholesterol (toxic)
- Hamycin
- Natamycin – 33 carbons, binds well to ergosterol
- Nystatin
- Rimocidin

=== Azoles ===
Azole antifungals inhibit the conversion of lanosterol to ergosterol by inhibiting lanosterol 14α-demethylase. These compounds have a five-membered ring containing two or three nitrogen atoms. The imidazole antifungals contain a 1,3-diazole (imidazole) ring (two nitrogen atoms), whereas the triazole antifungals have a ring with three nitrogen atoms.

==== Imidazoles ====
- Bifonazole
- Butoconazole
- Clotrimazole
- Econazole
- Fenticonazole
- Isoconazole
- Ketoconazole
- Luliconazole
- Miconazole
- Omoconazole
- Oxiconazole
- Sertaconazole
- Sulconazole
- Tioconazole

==== Triazoles ====
- Albaconazole
- Cyproconazole
- Efinaconazole
- Epoxiconazole
- Fluconazole
- Isavuconazole
- Itraconazole
- Posaconazole
- Propiconazole
- Ravuconazole
- Terconazole
- Voriconazole

==== Thiazoles ====
- Abafungin

=== Allylamines ===
Allylamines inhibit squalene epoxidase, another enzyme required for ergosterol synthesis. Examples include butenafine, naftifine, and terbinafine.

=== Echinocandins ===
Echinocandins inhibit the creation of glucan in the fungal cell wall by inhibiting 1,3-Beta-glucan synthase:

- Anidulafungin
- Caspofungin
- Micafungin
- Rezafungin

Echinocandins are administered intravenously, particularly for the treatment of resistant Candida species.

=== Triterpenoids ===
- Ibrexafungerp

=== Others ===
- Acrisorcin
- Amorolfine – a morpholine derivative used topically in dermatophytosis
- Aurones – possess antifungal properties
- Benzoic acid – has antifungal properties, such as in Whitfield's ointment, Friar's Balsam, and Balsam of Peru
- Carbol fuchsin (Castellani's paint)
- Ciclopirox (ciclopirox olamine) – a hydroxypyridone antifungal that interferes with active membrane transport, cell membrane integrity, and fungal respiratory processes. It is most useful against tinea versicolour.
- Clioquinol
- Coal tar
- Copper(II) sulfate
- Crystal violet – a triarylmethane dye. It has antibacterial, antifungal, and anthelmintic properties and was formerly important as a topical antiseptic.
- Chlorhexidine is a topical antibacterial and antifungal. It is commonly used in hospitals as an antiseptic. It is much more strongly antibacterial than antifungal, requiring at least a 10 times higher concentration to kill yeast compared to gram negative bacteria
- Chlorophetanol
- Diiodohydroxyquinoline (Iodoquinol)
- Flucytosine (5-fluorocytosine) – an antimetabolite pyrimidine analog
- Fumagillin
- Griseofulvin – binds to microtubules and inhibits mitosis
- Haloprogin – discontinued due to the emergence of antifungals with fewer side effects
- Miltefosine works by damaging fungal cell membranes
- Nikkomycin – blocks formation of chitin present in the cell wall of fungus.
- Orotomide (F901318) – pyrimidine synthesis inhibitor
- Piroctone olamine
- Pentanenitrile
- Potassium iodide – preferred treatment for lymphocutaneous sporotrichosis and subcutaneous zygomycosis (basidiobolomycosis). The mode of action is obscure.
- Potassium permanganate - for use only on thicker, more insensitive skin such as the soles of the feet.
- Selenium disulfide
- Sodium thiosulfate
- Sulfur
- Tolnaftate – a thiocarbamate antifungal, which inhibits fungal squalene epoxidase (similar mechanism to allylamines like terbinafine)
- Triacetin – hydrolysed to acetic acid by fungal esterases
- Undecylenic acid – an unsaturated fatty acid derived from natural castor oil; fungistatic, antibacterial, antiviral, and inhibits Candida morphogenesis
- Zinc pyrithione

== Side effects ==
Incidents of liver injury or failure among modern antifungal medicines are very low to non-existent. However, some can cause allergic reactions in people.

There are also many drug interactions. Patients must read in detail the enclosed data sheet(s) of any medicine. For example, the azole antifungals such as ketoconazole or itraconazole can be both substrates and inhibitors of the P-glycoprotein, which (among other functions) excretes toxins and drugs into the intestines. Azole antifungals are also both substrates and inhibitors of the cytochrome P450 family CYP3A4, causing increased concentration when administering, for example, calcium channel blockers, immunosuppressants, chemotherapeutic drugs, benzodiazepines, tricyclic antidepressants, macrolides and SSRIs.

Before oral antifungal therapies are used to treat nail disease, a confirmation of the fungal infection should be made. Approximately half of suspected cases of fungal infection in nails have a non-fungal cause. The side effects of oral treatment are significant and people without an infection should not take these drugs.

Azoles are the group of antifungals which act on the cell membrane of fungi. They inhibit the enzyme 14-alpha-sterol demethylase, a microsomal CYP, which is required for the biosynthesis of ergosterol for the cytoplasmic membrane. This leads to the accumulation of 14-alpha-methylsterols resulting in impairment of function of certain membrane-bound enzymes and disruption of close packing of acyl chains of phospholipids, thus inhibiting growth of the fungi. Some azoles directly increase permeability of the fungal cell membrane.

== Resistance ==
Antifungal resistance is a subset of antimicrobial resistance, that specifically applies to fungi that have become resistant to antifungals. Resistance to antifungals can arise naturally, for example by genetic mutation or through aneuploidy. Extended use of antifungals leads to the development of antifungal resistance through various mechanisms.

Some species of fungi exhibit intrinsic resistance to certain antifungal drugs or classes (e.g. Candida krusei and fluconazole), whereas other species may develop antifungal resistance due to external pressures. Antifungal resistance is a One Health concern, driven by multiple extrinsic factors, including extensive fungicidal use, overuse of clinical antifungals, environmental change and host factors.

Like resistance to antibacterials, antifungal resistance can be driven by antifungal use in agriculture. Currently there is no regulation on the use of similar antifungal classes in agriculture and the clinic.

The emergence of Candida auris as a potential human pathogen that sometimes exhibits multi-class antifungal drug resistance is concerning and has been associated with several outbreaks globally. The WHO has released a priority fungal pathogen list, including pathogens with antifungal resistance.
