= Farrell's medium =

Selective bacteriological medium for Brucella species

Farrell's medium is a selective bacteriological medium for Brucella species which is prepared by the addition of five antibiotics and one anti fungal to a basal bacteriological medium such as serum dextrose agar. In order to prepare 1 liter of the Farrell's medium, the following quantities are added to 1 liter of serum dextrose agar: polymyxin B sulfate (5000 units =5 mg), bacitracin (25,000 units = 25 mg), natamycin (50 mg), nalidixic acid (5 mg), nystatin (100,000 units), and vancomycin (20 mg). Vancomycin inhibits the growth of gram-positive bacteria on this medium, while nystatin inhibits the growth of fungi. Other antibiotics inhibit the growth of gram-negative bacteria other than Brucella species, thus favoring the exclusive growth of the latter in this medium.
