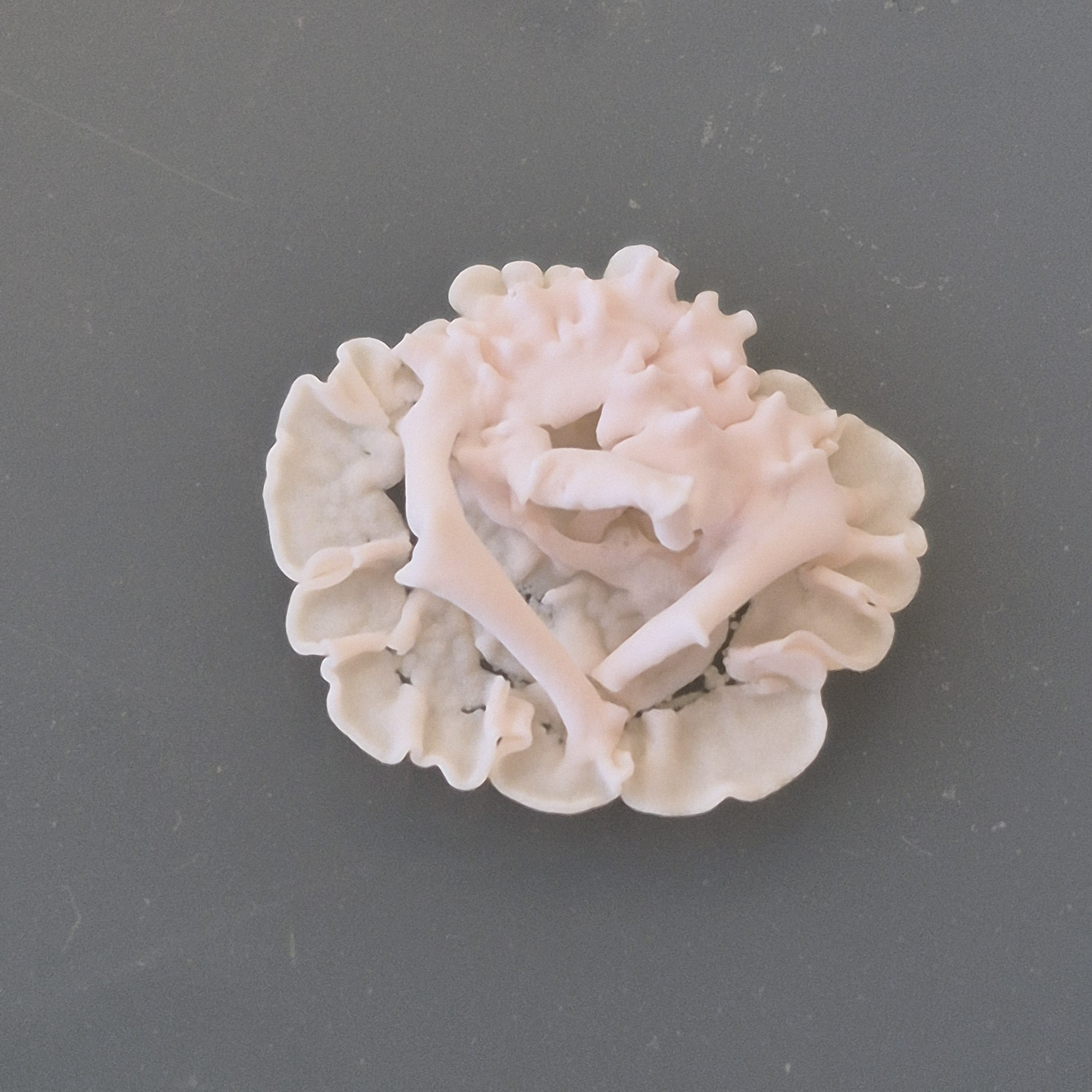
- A colony of Anthracocystis heteropogonicola isolated and growing on agar

Scientific classification
- Kingdom: Fungi
- Division: Basidiomycota
- Class: Ustilaginomycetes
- Order: Ustilaginales
- Family: Ustilaginaceae
- Genus: Anthracocystis
- Species: A. heteropogonicola

Binomial name
- Anthracocystis heteropogonicola (Mundk. & Thirum.) McTaggart & R.G.Shivas

Synonyms
- Sorosporium heteropogonicola Mundk. & Thirum.; Sporisorium heteropogonicola (Mundk. & Thirum.) Vánky

= Anthracocystis heteropogonicola =

Species of fungus

Anthracocystis heteropogonicola is a smut fungus that has both an anamorphic asexual yeast form, and a teleomorphic sexual form. It is one of many fungi within the class ustilaginomycetes that is dimorphic. The anamorphic yeast haplophase is saprobic, living on dead matter. During the dikaryophase, A. heteropogonicola functions as a plant pathogen. Its epitet comes from its pathogenic association with Heteropogon contortus, a tropical, perennial grass with wide distribution in the tropics and subtropics. The yeast morph of this fungus is rarely isolated, but widely distributed, possibly spreading to locations where their teleomorph form has not been observed.

The etymology of the genus name stems from latin and is inspired by its appearance during the teleomorphic phase and is a combination of two latin terms. "Anthrac" means "black", like coal, carbon, or charcoal, and "Cystis" translates as "pouch" or "bladder".

== Description ==
When isolated and grown on agar, the anamorphic form of A. heteropogonicola is an irregular spreading colony with a semi-opaque, uniform "white with a very light purplish tint". The growth has been described as "velvety, with ropey texture, margins distinct, appressed, hyaline at the very edges." Thicker areas of this fungi are entirely opaque because of the increased density of the fungus. The thinner areas and edges of the colony are semi-opaque.

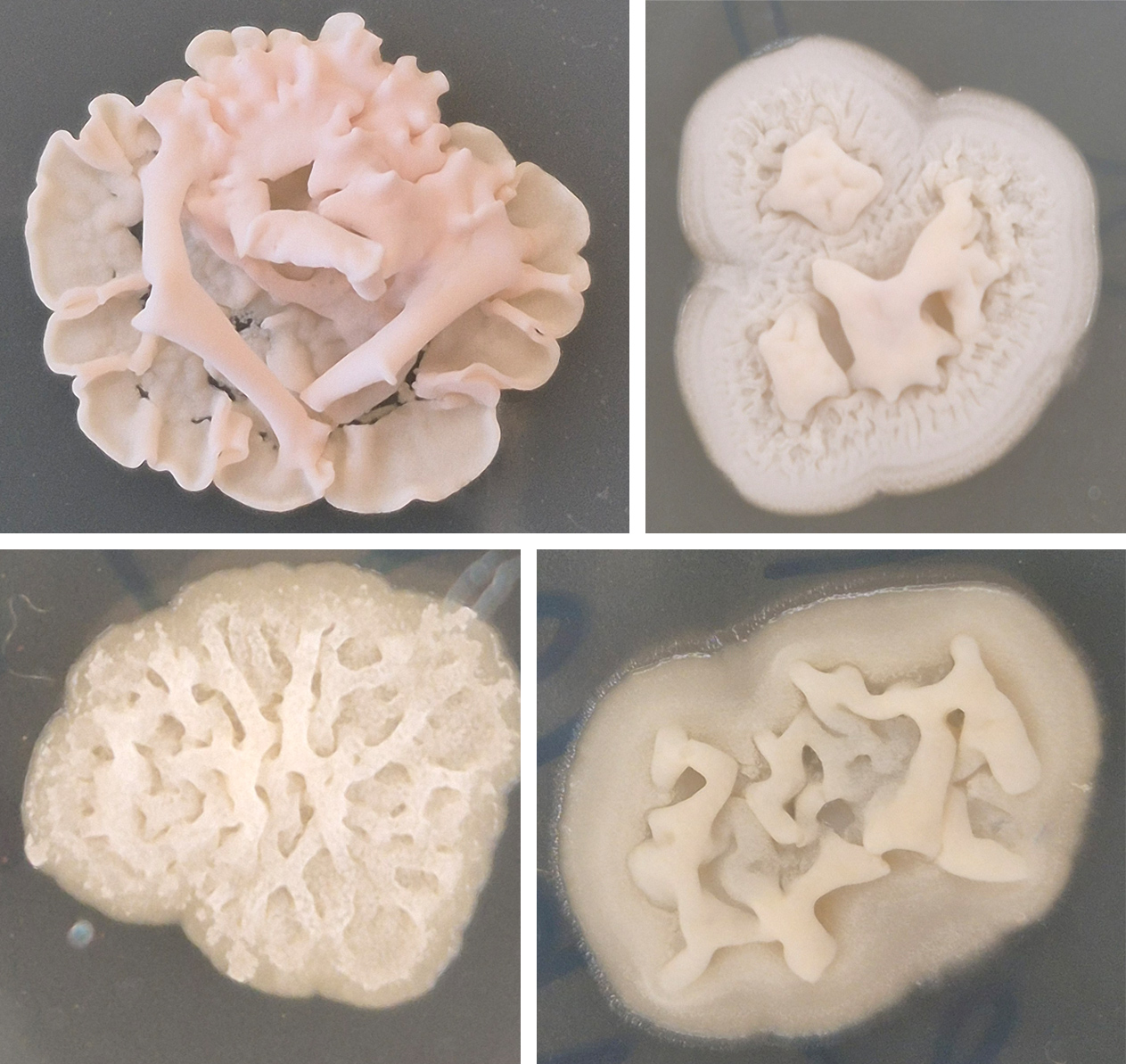
These photos display the variety of appearance and general growth habit of the colonies. The identity of these fungus colonies was verified by DNA sequencing.

When examined closely, the anamorph phase of this fungus is a yeast-morph with both spherical and elongated/elliptical individuals in the colony. It is a single-celled yeast that asexually buds to reproduce. Most of the budding is unipolar.

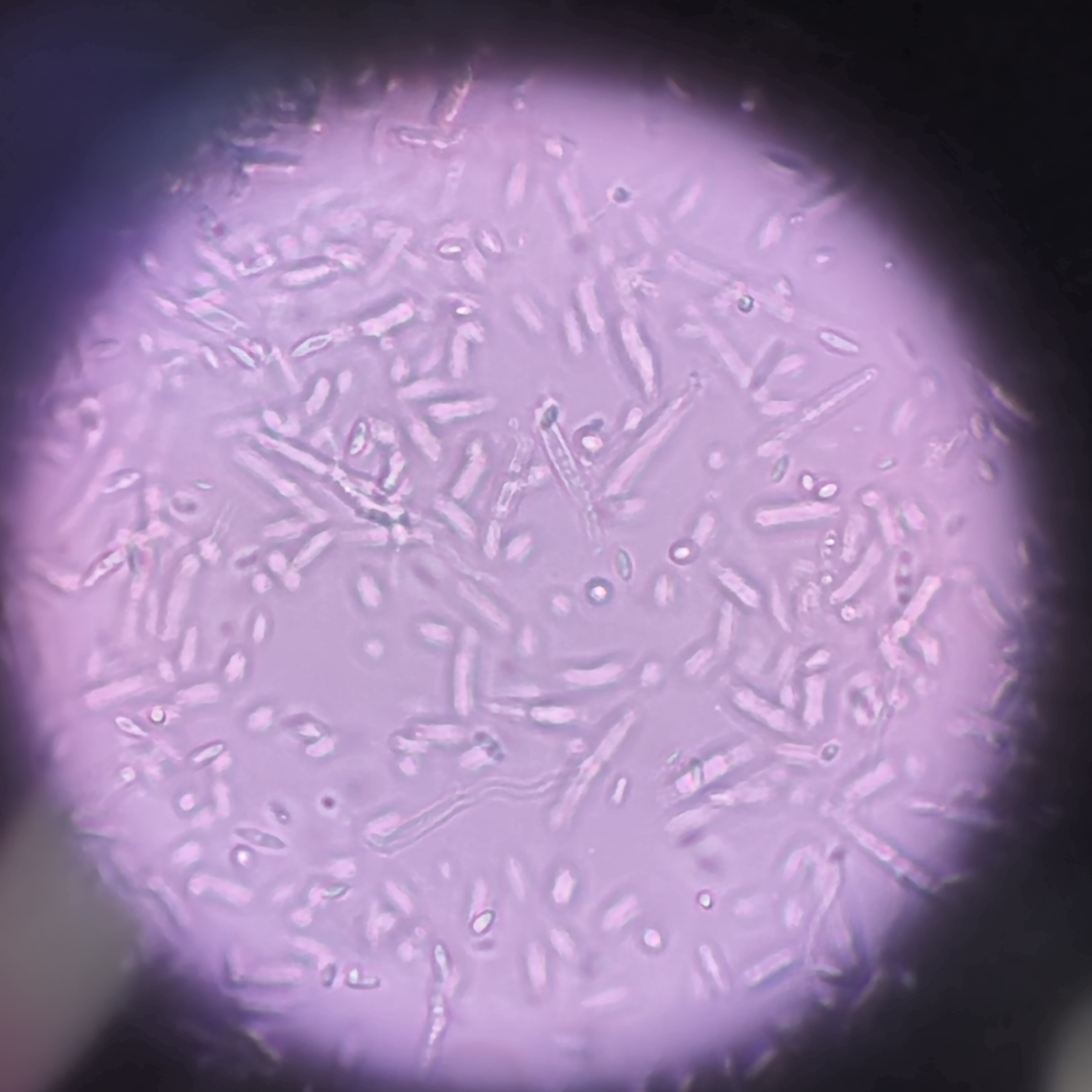
A view of Anthracocystis heteropogonicola anamorphic form yeast prepared on a slide at 400x (10 eyepiece x 40 stage magnification) using a compound microscope.

== Taxonomy ==
Changes to the International Code of Nomenclature for algae, fungi, and plants allow a single name for all fungi, therefore, dimorphic fungi integrate into one name regardless of morph. The teleomorphic phase of this fungus was formerly taxonomically categorized first as Sorosporium heteropogonicola by Balchandra Bhavanishankar Mundkur and Mandayam Jeersannidhi Thirumalachar in 1951, and then as Sporisorium heteropogonicola by Kálmán Vánky in 1997, before integrating into Anthracocystis heteropogonicola through the work of Alistair McTaggart, and Roger Graham Shivas, in 2012.

The type specimen is housed in Nandi Hills, Karnataka, India listed under the identifier CBS 312.66.
