= C47H73NO17 =

The molecular formula C_{47}H_{73}NO_{17} (molar mass: 924.08 g/mol, exact mass: 923.4878 u) may refer to:

- Amphotericin B
