= Streptomyces noursei =

Scientific classification
- Domain: Bacteria
- Kingdom: Bacillati
- Phylum: Actinomycetota
- Class: Actinomycetia
- Order: Streptomycetales
- Family: Streptomycetaceae
- Genus: Streptomyces
- Species: S. noursei

Binomial name
- Streptomyces noursei Brown et al. 1953

Species of bacterium

Streptomyces noursei is a bacterium species in the genus Streptomyces.

== Uses ==
Nystatin is a polyene antifungal medication isolated from S. noursei.
