= Filipin =

Filipin III
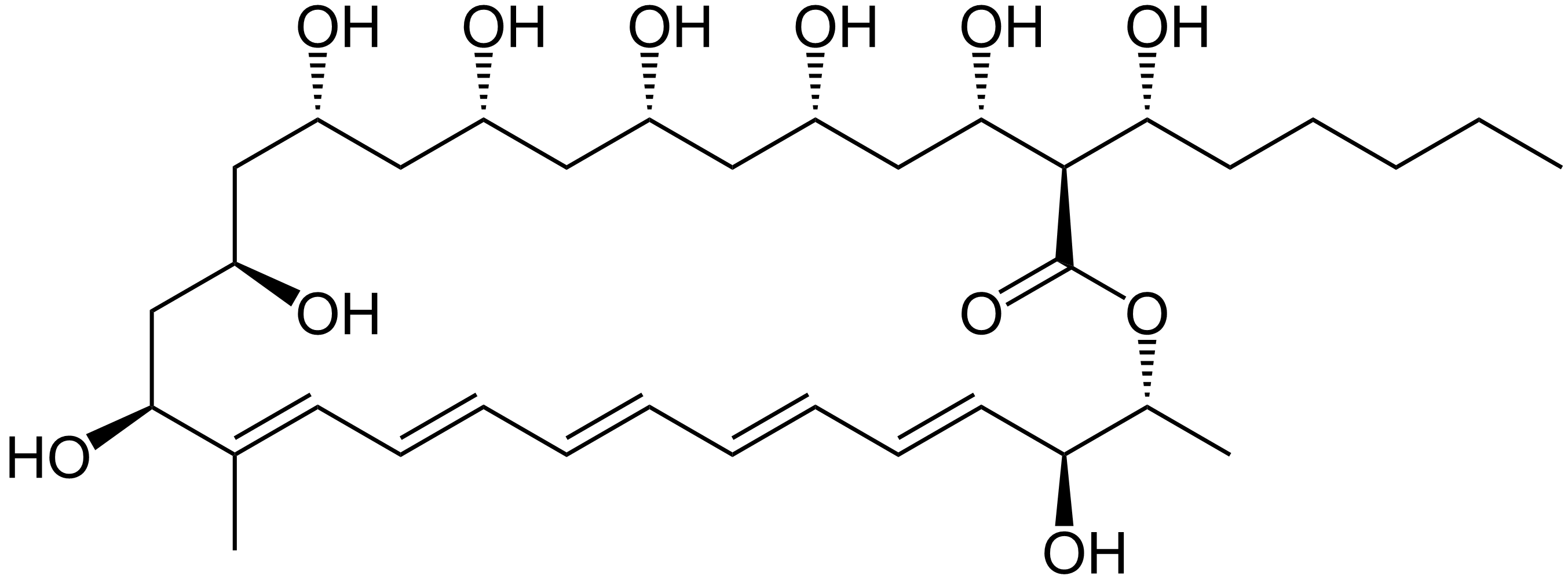

Names
- Preferred IUPAC name (3R,4S,6S,8S,10R,12R,14R,16S,17E,19E,21E,23E,25E,27S,28R)-4,6,8,10,12,14,16,27-Octahydroxy-3-[(1R)-1-hydroxyhexyl]-17,28-dimethyl-1-oxacyclooctacosa-17,19,21,23,25-pentaen-2-one

Identifiers
CAS Number	480-49-9
3D model (JSmol)	Interactive image
ChemSpider	21106312
ECHA InfoCard	100.164.904
KEGG	D04186
MeSH	Filipin
PubChem CID	6433194
UNII	87Z59R7D14
- InChI: InChI=1S/C35H58O11/c1-4-5-11-16-31(42)34-33(44)22-29(40)20-27(38)18-25(36)17-26(37)19-28(39)21-32(43)23(2)14-12-9-7-6-8-10-13-15-30(41)24(3)46-35(34)45/h6-10,12-15,24-34,36-44H,4-5,11,16-22H2,1-3H3/b7-6+,10-8+,12-9+,15-13+,23-14+/t24-,25+,26-,27+,28-,29+,30+,31+,32+,33+,34-/m1/s1 Key: IMQSIXYSKPIGPD-NKYUYKLDSA-N; InChI=1/C35H58O11/c1-4-5-11-16-31(42)34-33(44)22-29(40)20-27(38)18-25(36)17-26(37)19-28(39)21-32(43)23(2)14-12-9-7-6-8-10-13-15-30(41)24(3)46-35(34)45/h6-10,12-15,24-34,36-44H,4-5,11,16-22H2,1-3H3/b7-6+,10-8+,12-9+,15-13+,23-14+/t24-,25+,26-,27+,28-,29+,30+,31+,32+,33+,34-/m1/s1 Key: IMQSIXYSKPIGPD-NKYUYKLDBD
- SMILES: CCCCC[C@H](O)[C@H]1C(=O)O[C@H](C)[C@@H](O)\C=C\C=C\C=C\C=C\C=C(/C)[C@@H](O)C[C@H](O)C[C@H](O)C[C@H](O)C[C@H](O)C[C@H](O)C[C@@H]1O

Properties
Chemical formula	C_{35}H_{58}O_{11}
Molar mass	654.838 g·mol^{−1}
- Except where otherwise noted, data are given for materials in their standard state (at 25 °C [77 °F], 100 kPa). verify (what is ?) Infobox references

Filipin is a mixture of chemical compounds first isolated by chemists at the Upjohn company in 1955 from the mycelium and culture filtrates of a previously unknown actinomycete, Streptomyces filipinensis. It was discovered in a soil sample collected in the Philippine Islands, hence the name filipin. The isolate possessed potent antifungal activity. It was identified as a polyene macrolide based on its characteristic UV-Vis and IR spectra.

== Functions ==
Although the polyene macrolide antibiotics exhibit potent antifungal activity, most are too toxic for therapeutic applications, with the exceptions of amphotericin B and nystatin A1. Unlike amphotericin B and nystatin A1 which form sterol-dependent ion channels, filipin is thought to be a simple membrane disrupter. Since filipin is highly fluorescent and binds specifically to cholesterol, it has found widespread use as a histochemical stain for cholesterol. This method of detecting cholesterol in cell membranes is used clinically in the study and diagnosis of Type C Niemann-Pick disease.

It is also used in cellular biology as an inhibitor of the raft/caveolae endocytosis pathway on mammalian cells (at concentrations around 3 μg/mL)

== Types ==
Filipin is a mixture of four components - filipin I (4%), II (25%), III (53%), and IV (18%) - and should be referred to as the filipin complex.

- The major component, filipin III, has the structure which was proposed by Ceder and Ryhage for the filipin complex.
- Filipin I, which has been difficult to characterize, is probably a mixture of several components, each having two hydroxyl groups fewer than filipin III.
- Mass spectrometry and NMR data indicate that Filipin II is 1'-deoxy-filipin III.
- Filipin IV is isomeric to filipin III. Their NMR spectra are nearly identical, with the major difference being the splitting pattern of the proton at C2. This indicates that filipin IV is probably epimeric to filipin III at either C1' or C3.

The relative and absolute stereochemistry of filipin III was determined by 13C NMR acetonide analysis.
