= Polyene =

Polyunsaturated organic compound

In organic chemistry, polyenes are polyunsaturated organic compounds that contain multiple carbon–carbon double bonds (C=C). Some sources consider dienes to be polyenes, whereas others require polyenes to contain three carbon–carbon double bonds (trienes) or more.

Conjugated polyenes contain a conjugated system of alternating single and double carbon–carbon bonds, with characteristic optical properties.

Annulenes are conjugated cyclopolyenes.

The following polyenes are used as antifungals for humans: amphotericin B, nystatin, candicidin, pimaricin, methyl partricin, and trichomycin.

== Optical properties ==
Some polyenes are brightly colored, an otherwise rare property for a hydrocarbon. Normally alkenes absorb in the ultraviolet region of a spectrum, but the absorption energy state of polyenes with numerous conjugated double bonds can be lowered such that they enter the visible region of the spectrum, resulting in compounds which are coloured (because they contain a chromophore). Thus many natural dyes contain linear polyenes.

== Chemical and electrical properties ==
Polyenes tend to be more reactive than simpler alkenes. For example, polyene-containing triglycerides degrade in atmospheric oxygen via the process of rancidification and drying. Polyacetylene exhibits high electrical conductivity in air. Most conductive polymers are polyenes, and many have conjugated structures.

== Occurrence ==
A few fatty acids are polyenes. Another class of important polyenes are polyene antimycotics.

Representative polyenes

1,3,5-Hexatriene is the simplest triene

Amphotericin B is an example of a polyene antifungal (antimycotic) agent.

Leukotriene A4 is a regulator of the immune response.

Polyacetylenes are a synthetic polymer of theoretical interest because they exhibit metallic properties upon oxidation.

== See also ==
- Polyyne
