= S. natalensis =

S. natalensis may refer to:

- Sevenia natalensis, the Natal tree nymph, a butterfly species found in southeastern Africa
- Streptomyces natalensis, a bacterium species
