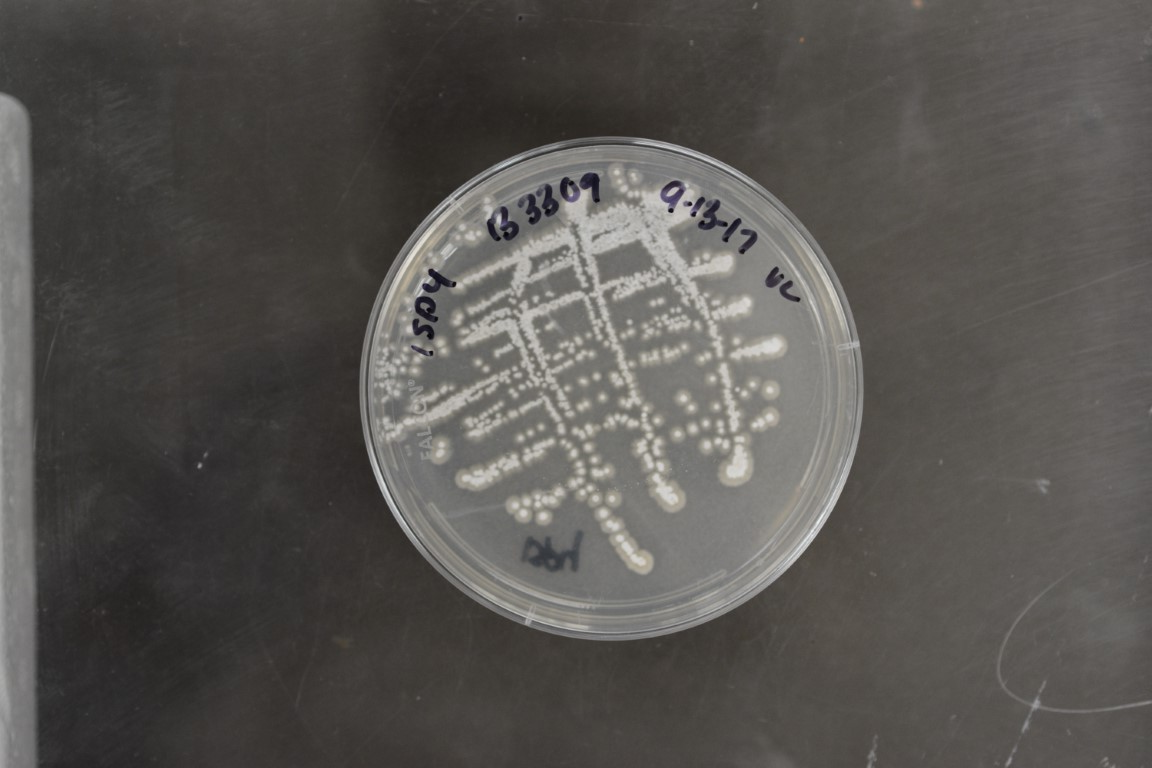

Scientific classification
- Domain: Bacteria
- Kingdom: Bacillati
- Phylum: Actinomycetota
- Class: Actinomycetes
- Order: Streptomycetales
- Family: Streptomycetaceae
- Genus: Streptomyces
- Species: S. durhamensis

Binomial name
- Streptomyces durhamensis Gordon and Lapa 1966

Type strain
- AS 4.1699, ATCC 23194, BCRC 16203, CBS 742.72, CCRC 16203, CGMCC 4.1699, DSM 40539, Gordon 59123, HAMBI 1064, IFO 13441, IMET 43359, ISP 5539, JCM 4291, JCM 4747, KCC S-0747, KCTC 9723, N.Y.S. 59123, NBRC 13441, NRRL B-3309, NRRL-ISP 5539, RIA 1402, VKM Ac-763

= Streptomyces durhamensis =

Species of bacterium

Streptomyces durhamensis is a bacterium species from the genus of Streptomyces which has been isolated from soil from a tomato plant. Streptomyces durhamensis produces durhamycin and filipin.

== See also ==
- List of Streptomyces species
