= Polyene antimycotic =

Class of antifungal compounds

Polyene antimycotics, sometimes referred to as polyene antibiotics, are a class of antimicrobial polyene compounds that target fungi. These polyene antimycotics are typically obtained from certain species of Streptomyces bacteria. Previously, polyenes were thought to bind to ergosterol in the fungal cell membrane, weakening it and causing leakage of K^{+} and Na^{+} ions, which could contribute to fungal cell death. However, more detailed studies of polyene molecular properties have challenged this model suggesting that polyenes instead bind and extract ergosterol directly from the cellular membrane thus disrupting the many cellular functions ergosterols perform. Amphotericin B, nystatin, and natamycin are examples of polyene antimycotics. They are a subgroup of macrolides.

== Structures ==
Their chemical structures feature a large ring of atoms (in essence, a cyclic ester ring) containing multiple conjugated carbon-carbon double bonds (hence polyene) on one side of the ring and multiple hydroxyl groups bonded to the other side of the ring. Their structures also often have a D-mycosamine (a type of amino-glycoside) group bonded to the molecule. The series of conjugated double bonds typically absorbs strongly in the ultraviolet-visible region of the electromagnetic spectrum, often resulting in the polyene antibiotics having a yellow color.

Chemical structure of Amphotericin B. Amphotericin B is an example of a yellow polyene antimycotic agent. Note the alternating double and single bonds in the center and the mycosamine group in the bottom-right corner.

Chemical structure of Nystatin.

Chemical structure of Natamycin, sometimes called pimaricin.

== Biosynthesis ==
The natural route to synthesis includes polyketide synthase components.

== Other examples of polyenes ==
- Rimocidin
- Filipin
- Candicin
- Hamycin
- Perimycin
- Dermostatin
- Turletricin
