= M. J. Thirumalachar =

Indian botanist (1914–1999)

- Born: Mandayam Jeersannidhi Thirumalachar; 22 September 1914; Mysore State, British India
- Died: 21 April 1999 (aged 84); Walnut Creek, California, US
- Education: Central College of Bangalore; University of Mysore; University of Wisconsin–Madison; Danish Institute of Seed Pathology; Jeersannidhi Anderson Institute
- Known for: Discovery of fungi and development of antibiotics
- Awards: 1967 Shanti Swarup Bhatnagar Prize; 1967 INSA Sunder Lal Hora Medal; Polish Academy of Sciences Medal
- Scientific career
- Fields: Mycology; Antibiotics
- Workplaces: Banaras Hindu University; Central College of Bangalore; Central Potato Research Institute; Hindustan Antibiotics Limited; University of Minnesota Medical School
- Doctoral advisor: James G. Dickson

Mandayam Jeersannidhi Thirumalachar (22 September 1914 – 21 April 1999) was an Indian mycologist, microbiologist, plant pathologist and the co-founder of Jeersannidhi-Anderson Institute, California. He was the head of R&D at Hindustan Antibiotics Limited and a professor at Banaras Hindu University as well as the Central College of Bangalore. He was known for the development of antifungal antibiotics such as Hamycin, Dermostatin, Aureofungin, MYc-4 and Tetraenenin and was an elected fellow of the Indian National Science Academy. The Council of Scientific and Industrial Research, the apex agency of the Government of India for scientific research, awarded him the Shanti Swarup Bhatnagar Prize for Science and Technology, one of the highest Indian science awards for his contributions to Medical Sciences in 1967.

== Biography ==
University of Mysore

M. J. Thirumalachar was born in the erstwhile Mysore State of British India on 22 September 1914 to Vengadammal - M. J. Narasimhan couple as their second child. His father was a plant pathologist and mycologist after whom two genera of fungi (Narasimhella and Narasimhania) have been named. The young boy was named after his great-grandfather, Jeersannidhi Thirumalachar Swamy, erstwhile head of Sri Yadugiri Yathiraja Mutt, a vaishnavite religious center situated in Melukote. After early schooling in Malleswaram, a neighborhood of Bengaluru, he graduated from Central College, Bangalore before earning a Doctor of Science from the University of Mysore in 1944 and moved to the University of Wisconsin from where he secured a PhD in 1948 working under the supervision of James G. Dickson. (Note: His thesis, Studies on some stripe smuts of grasses in Wisconsin, was later published as a book.) On his return to India, he served at Banaras Hindu University as the head of the department of Mycology and Plant Pathology and at the Central College of Bangalore. Subsequently, he joined Central Potato Research Institute, Patna as the Chief Plant Pathologist but moved to Hindustan Antibiotics Limited (HAL) where he headed the R and D division. He served out his regular career at HAL, superannuating as the superintendent of research in 1975. Later, he returned to the US and served as a professor at the Department of Pediatrics of University of Minnesota Medical School where he worked on the incorporation of human insulin gene in yeast cells and also had a short stint as a visiting scientist at the Danish Institute of Seed Pathology, Copenhagen. In 1979, he founded Jeersannidhi Anderson Institute, along with his son, M. J. Narasimhan Jr., for advanced research in mycology and plant pathology and was the director of the institute till the end of his life.

Thirumalachar's family produced four notable mycologists; M. J. Narasimhan (father), M. J. Narasimhan jr. (son) and M. C. Srinivasan (nephew), besides himself. He spent the last two decades of his life in Walnut Creek, California and it was here he died on 21 April 1999, at the age of 84.

== Legacy ==
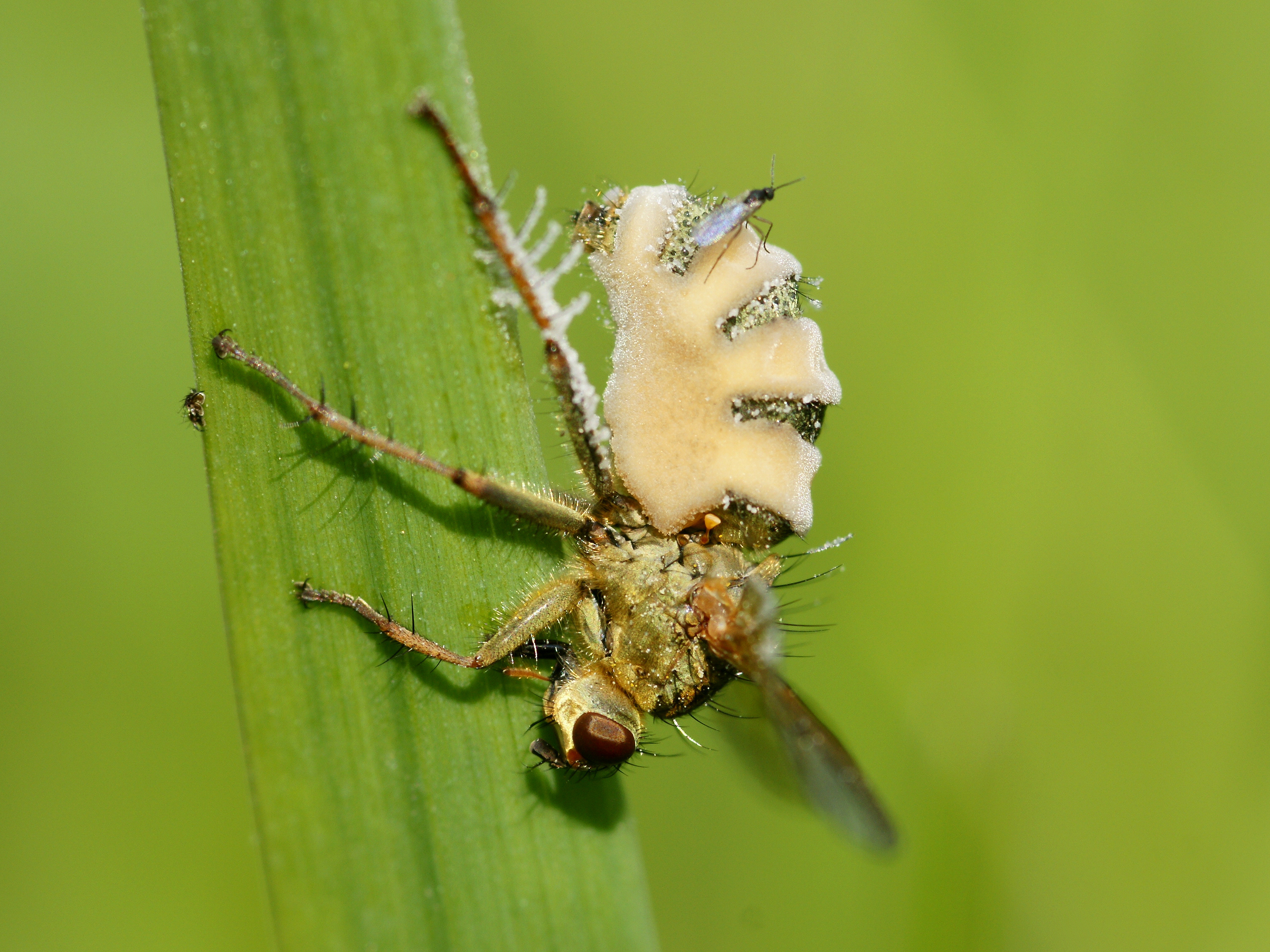
Entomophthora muscae fungus on the yellow dung fly, Scathophaga stercoraria. Thirumalachar identified a methodology for characterizing the fungus.

Thirumalachar's researches spanned across various disciplines of science such as botany, mycology, microbiology, antibiotics and chemotherapy and his studies on fungi covered all major groups in mycology. The first of his several discoveries was in 1943 when he identified Masseeella breyniae, a species of rust, revealed through an article published in New Phytologist journal. He was the first scientist, along with M. J. Narasimhan and Charles Gardner Shaw, to describe the genus Sclerophthora, which he published in an article, "The sporangial phase of the downy mildew Elensine coracana with a discussion of the identity of Sclerospora macrospora Sacc." in 1953. Ten years later, he described another genus, Georgefischeria, a genus of fungi named after renowned mycologist, G. W. Fischer, in 1953. He proposed a morphological methodology for characterizing Entomophthora from Conidiobolus, two genera of fungi and discovered two other genera, viz. Narasimhania and Narasimhella, both named after his father, M. J. Narasimhan. Two of his other discoveries were Mehtamyces, a genus of fungi, and Flueggea virosa, a species of bushweed. He furthered the studies of the British mycologist, Arthur Barclay, on Aecidium esculentum, and identified Ravenelia esculenta as the causal factor for malformations in Acacia eburnea. Overall, he established the presence of 30 new genera and 300 new species of fungi which included Mundukurella (named after his collaborator, B. B. Mundkur), Franzpetrakia and Chainia. as well as three species of Masseeëlla fungi, named Masseeëlla breyniae, Masseeëlla flueggeae, and Masseeëlla narasimhanii.

During his days at Hindustan Antibiotics Limited, Thirumalachar focused on medical mycology and plant disease control. As the head of the research and development division, he led a team of scientists who developed a number of antibiotic preparations, including Antiamoebin of Emericellopsis sp, an antimicrobial polypeptide that has reported use as a carrier, as a pore-forming peptaibol, as a de-worming agent, and as a yield-enhancing supplement in dairy and poultry industries. Antifungal antibiotics, such as Hamycin, Dermostatin, Aureofungin, MYc-4 and Tetraenenin are some of the other products developed by his team at Hindustan Antibiotics. At University of Minnesota, he developed a set of chemicals, New chemotherapeutic agents for the control of plant and animal diseases, that has since been put to use as a product, Phyton-27, by Phyton Corporation. He documented his research by way of several monographs and articles published in peer-reviewed journals. (Note: Please see Selected bibliography section) He also held a number of US patents; several of them for processes he developed jointly with his father and son. Many of the chemotherapeutants developed by him are in commercial use under various names such as Jai-Pro, MJN-1891 and Gopi-80. He also mentored many students and B. G. L. Swamy was one among them.

Thirumalachar was one of the founders of Mycological Society of India, served as its first vice president and was a lifetime member of the society. He founded Hindustan Antibiotics Bulletin, the official journal of Hindustan Antibiotics Limited and was its first editor and publisher. He was the president of the Indian Phytopathological Society in 1956 and was the chief editor of Indian Phytopathology and Applied Microbiology, the official journal of the Society, in 1957. He was also involved with the International Journal of Antibiotics as a member of its editorial board and served on the council of the Indian National Science Academy during 1969–71. He was a member of the Mycological Society of America as well as Indian Microbiological Society and chaired the Agricultural section of the 37th Indian Science Congress held in Pune in 1950.

== Awards and honors ==
The Indian National Science Academy elected Thirumalachar as their fellow in 1956; INSA honored him again in 1967 with Sunder Lal Hora Medal. The Council of Scientific and Industrial Research awarded him Shanti Swarup Bhatnagar Prize, one of the highest Indian science awards the same year. He was also an elected fellow of Indian Phytopathological Society, New York Academy of Sciences and Mycological Society of India and a recipient of the Polish Academy of Sciences Medal. A number of scientists have acknowledged his contributions to science. The Indian Institute of Science organizes an annual lecture, M J Thirumalachar & M J Narasimhan Endowment Lecture in his honor and the Mycological Society of India has instituted an award, Dr. M.J. Thirumalachar Merit Awards for Young Scientists, for promoting research excellence in mycology.

== Selected bibliography ==
=== Books and monographs ===
- Thirumalachar, M.J. (1941). Tuberculina on Uromyces Hobsoni Vize.
- Thirumalachar, M.J. (1942). Puccinia Droogensis Butler on Berberis Aristata.
- Mundkur, Balachandra Bhavanishankar; Thirumalachar, M.J. (1946). Revisions of and Additions to Indian Fungi. By Mundkur, B.B. and Thirumalachar, M.J.. (no. 2, Etc. By Mundkur, B.B. and Ahmad, Sultan.). Kew.
- Bhalchandra Bhavanishankar Mundkur; Sultan Ahmad (1946). Revisions of and Additions to Indian Fungi: II. Imperial Mycological Institute.
- Studies on some stripe smuts of grasses in Wisconsin. University of Wisconsin—Madison. 1948. p. 98. OCLC 51679618.
- Thirumalachar, M.J.; Mundkur, Bhalchandra Bhavanishankar (1951). Revisions of and Additions to Indian Fungi: III. Imperial Mycological Institute.
- Mundkur, Bhalchendra Bhavanishanker; Thirumalachar, Mandayam Jeersannidhi (1952). Ustilaginales of India. Commonwealth Mycological Institute.
- Govindu, H.C.; Thirumalachar, M.J. (1963). Check list of Cercospora species in India. Government of India. p. 47. OCLC 6558224.
- Raychaudhuri, Satya Prasad; Prasada, R.; Thirumalachar, M.J. (1970). Plant disease problems: proceedings of the First International Symposium on Plant Pathology, December 26, 1966 – January 1, 1967. Indian Phytopathological Society, Indian Agricultural Research Institute.

=== Articles ===
- Narasimhan, M.J.; Thirumalachar, M.J. (1943). "Preliminary notes on the perfect stage of Ephelis oryzae Syd. Balansia oryzae comb. nov". Current Science. 12: 276.
- Thirumalachar, M.J.; Shaw, C.G.; Narasimhan, M.T. (1953). "The sporangial phase of the downy mildew Elensine coracana with a discussion of the identity of Sclerospora macrospora Sacc". Bulletin of the Torrey Botanical Club. 80 (4): 299–307. doi:10.2307/2481765. JSTOR 2481765.
- Thirumalachar, M.J. (1955). "Chainia, a New Genus of the Actinomycetales". Nature. 176 (4489): 934–935. Bibcode:1955Natur.176..934T. doi:10.1038/176934b0. PMID 13272724. S2CID 1200699.
- Thirumalachar, M.J.; Narasimhan, M.J. (1955). "Notes on myriangiaceous fungi. I". Mycologia. 47 (5): 758–762. doi:10.2307/3755584. JSTOR 3755584.
- Thirumalachar, M.J. (1956). "Aureofungin, a systemic antifungal antibiotic for plant disease control". Annali di Microbiologia ed Enzimologia. ISSN 0003-4649. Archived from the original on 13 May 2021.
- Thirumalachar, M.J.; Sukapure, Rahalkar P.W.; Gopalkrishnan, K.S. (1966). "Studies on species of the genus Chainia from India. II". Hindustan Antibiot Bull. 9 (1): 10–15. PMID 5974779.
- Rahalkar, P.W.; Thirumalachar, M.J. (1970). "Effect of some pentaenes against some seed-borne diseases". Hindustan Antibiot Bull. 12 (2): 66–67. PMID 5428378.
- M. J. Thirumalachar (1970). "Prof. M. J. Narasimhan" (PDF). Sydowia.
- Ahlawat, Y.S.; Payak, M. M.; Thirumalachar, M.J. (1989). "Control of Citrus Greening Disease in India" (PDF). Current Science. 58 (16).
- Thirumalachar, M. J. (2006). "Masseeella Breynia – A New Species of Dust". New Phytologist. 42 (1): 45–48. doi:10.1111/j.1469-8137.1943.tb04984.x.

=== Patents ===
- "New chemotherapeutic agents for the control of plant and animal diseases". US Patent No. US4673687. Google Patents. 16 June 1987.
- Thirumalachar, Mandayam Jeersannidhi; Narasimhan, Mandayam Jeersannidhi Jr. (2000). "Synthesis of pharmaceutical compositions with lactams and .beta.-lactams/oxo thia azabicyclo compounds". US Patent No. 6015808. Justia Patents.
- Thirumalachar, Mandayam J.; Narasimhan, Mandayam J. Jr. (15 November 1983). "Microbial degradation of petroleum materials". Google Patents. p. US Patent No. US 4415661 A.
- Thirumalachar, Mandayam J; Narasimhan, Mandayam J. Jr. (23 May 1985). "Method, compound and composition for effecting degradation of crude petroleum and petroleum products in an environment". Google Patents. p. US Patent No. WO1985002196 A1.
- Thirumalachar, Mandayam J.; J. Narasimhan, Mandayam; Anderson, John A. (4 April 1978). "Process for the production of insulin by genetically transformed fungal cells". Google Patents. p. US Patent No. US 4082613 A.
- Thirumalachar, Mandayam J. (19 July 1966). "Process of producing hamycin antibiotic and product produced". Google Patents. p. US Patent No. US3261751 A.
- Thirumalachar, Mandayam J.; Narasimhan, Mandayam J. Jr.; Thirumalachar, Mandayam J. Kasthuri (19 August 1980). "N,N'Dibenzylethylenediamine-diacetylsalicylate, a novel chemotherapeutic agent for pain relief by external application". Google Patents. p. US Patent No. US 4218445 A.

== See also ==
- List of mycologists
