= Elizabeth Lee Hazen =

American microbiologist (1885–1975)

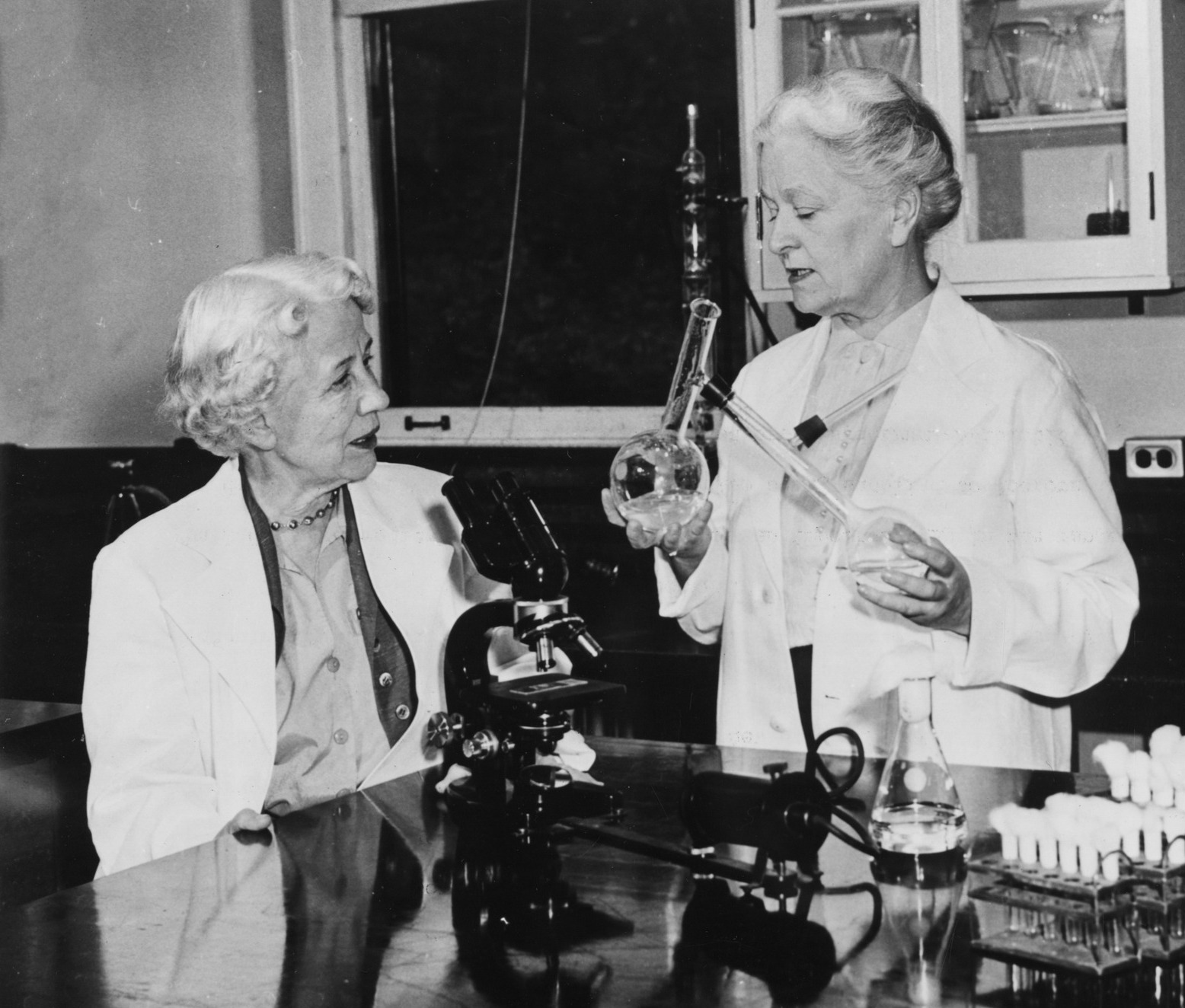
- Hazen (left) and Rachel Fuller Brown
- Born: August 24, 1885; Rich, Mississippi, U.S.
- Died: June 24, 1975 (aged 89); Seattle, Washington, U.S.
- Education: Mississippi University for Women; Columbia University
- Known for: Developing nystatin, the first anti-fungal drug
- Awards: The Squibb Award in Chemotherapy; The Rhoda Benham Award of Medical Mycological Society of the Americas; The Chemical Pioneer Award of the American Institute of Chemists; National Inventors Hall of Fame
- Scientific career
- Fields: Microbiology
- Workplaces: New York State Department of Public Health, Division of Laboratories and Research

Elizabeth Lee Hazen (August 24, 1885 – June 24, 1975) was an American microbiologist and physiologist most known for her contribution to the development of nystatin. Her education focused on science and research where she developed a passion for microbiology. Her peers and teachers knew her as a quick learner and a bright student, and she was one of the first women to earn a doctorate at Columbia University in 1927. In 1948, she teamed up with Rachel Fuller Brown to develop nystatin, the first non-toxic drug treatment for fungal infections in humans. Her research had multiple applications ranging from saving infected trees to restoring paintings and artwork damaged due to mold. Hazen and Brown were inducted into the National Inventors Hall of Fame posthumously in 1994, the second and third women achieving that honor.

== Early life ==
Elizabeth Lee Hazen was born on August 24, 1885, in Rich, Mississippi, to William Edgar Hazen and Maggie Harper Hazen. She was their second daughter and middle of three children. Her parents died when she was four, and the three children were adopted by an aunt and uncle.

== Education ==
Hazen attended the Mississippi University for Women (then Mississippi Industrial Institute and College), and obtained a Bachelor of Science degree there in 1910. While teaching biology and high school physics in Jackson, Mississippi, she continued her education by attending summer schools at the University of Tennessee and University of Virginia. Following her teaching job, Hazen applied and was accepted into the Department of Biology at Columbia for graduate studies. She completed a Master's of Biology at Columbia University in 1917 and a Ph.D. in microbiology there in 1927, one of their first female doctoral students. She served as an Army diagnostic laboratory technician during World War I. In the 1920s, while studying at Columbia University, Hazen worked with ricin and its effect on Clostridium botulinum toxin.

== Scientific work ==
=== After graduation ===
With her strong science background and experience in the field, Hazen continued her research in bacteria and immunology. She was presented with an opportunity in 1931 to work with the New York State Department of Health. She accepted and worked in the Bacterial Diagnosis Laboratory Division in New York City. She had several major accomplishments there in the field of bacterial diagnosis. Among her works there were tracing an outbreak of anthrax, locating sources of tularemia, and tracing the source of food poisoning from improperly preserved foods.

From there, she worked at the New York office of the Division of Laboratories and Research of the State Department of Public Health. There she learned, trained, and studied about fungi and fungal diseases. She had picked up a project there and started producing her own culture collection. This collection and the research along with it helped place her name in the National Inventors Hall of Fame.

=== Development of nystatin ===
In 1944, she was chosen by Augustus Wadsworth, founder and head of the division, to be in charge of an investigation into fungi and their relation to bacteria and other microbes. In addition to a microbiologist (Hazen), a biochemist was also needed, and Rachel Fuller Brown was chosen. Hazen started researching and studying fungal diseases, specifically ones that had been widespread in the city. This included diseases such as pneumonia and moniliasis (thrush), a mouth condition that makes swallowing painful. She had a growing collection of fungi and was studying the effects and possible antifungal agents. However, Elizabeth needed someone to identify and isolate the antifungal activity occurring within samples. She was introduced by Dalldorf, the direction of the division in Albany, in 1948 to Rachel Fuller Brown, who had a laboratory in Albany.

Their research started by collecting soil samples from all over the country. Dr. Hazen cultured Actinomycetes (microorganisms most frequently having antifungal properties) from each sample and tested them to see if any fungal activity was present. If any activity was found, the soil sample was shipped to Albany, where Dr. Brown prepared samples and extracts from the cultures by isolating the chemical agents that appeared to have the property of killing fungi. These new samples would then be shipped back to New York City, where Hazen would test the samples again for toxicity. She would expose the organisms against two fungi, Candida albicans and Cryptococcus neoformans. She would then purify promising samples for further test of fungistatic and fungicidal activity.

In 1948, Hazen and Brown began searching for an effective antifungal agent. Hazen found a promising micro-organism in the soil of a friend's dairy farm. She named it Streptomyces noursei, after William Nourse, the farm's owner. S. noursei was found to produce two antifungal substances. One turned out to be toxic for mice, but the other, when purified, turned out to be effective against candidiasis and a fungus that invaded the lungs and central nervous system. In 1950, they presented their discovery, the first safe and effective antifungal antibiotic, to the National Academy of Sciences. They originally named it fungicidin, but later renamed it nystatin, in honor of their employer, the New York State Department of Public Health.

In fall 1950, Dr. Hazen and Dr. Brown announced at a National Academy of Sciences meeting that they had successfully produced two antifungal agents from an antibiotic. This led to their development of nystatin (named in honor of the New York State Public Health Department), the first fungicide safe for treating humans. After several animal and human studies proved satisfactory to the FDA, nystatin was put into the market through E.R. Squibb & Sons in 1954 and earning over $135,000 in its first year. Hazen and Brown donated their royalties, over $13 million, to the nonprofit Research Corporation and the Brown-Hazen Fund, which focused specifically on microbiology research. As administrators of the Fund, Hazen and Brown encouraged young women in science and scientific research.

== Patent ==
Nystatin (antifungal / antibiotic) Patent Number: 2,797,183

A patent was filed in late 1950 for nystatin. It took Hazen, Brown, and Squibb Research Company six and half years to secure a patent for the invention. Two reasons caused the delay. First, testing had to be done to prove the utility of the product. This required animal and human trials to be conducted for FDA approval. Nystatin was granted approval by the FDA and released by Squibb in 1954. In addition, an article published in the Journal of Investigative Dermatology in 1954 suggested Hazen and Brown exposed methods of nystatin in another article previously published in 1949. If this were the case, then it would have been over a year before a patent was filed, rendering the pending patent useless. However, after research and a signature by the author of the 1954 article stating there was no connection, the U.S. Patent Office issued a patent on June 25, 1957. It covered nystatin and the method of preparation for the next 17 years. Hazen and Brown obtained the patent in 1957.

== Later life ==
Hazen continued to do research in laboratory in her later years as her experience and skills were very useful and beneficial to those around her. She continued to study the several uses of nystatin for other diseases and conditions.

== Awards ==
Towards the end of her life, she received a series of awards for her success, including the Squibb Award in Chemotherapy, the Rhoda Benham Award of the Medical Mycological Society of the Americas, an honorary degree from Hobart and William Smith Colleges, and the Chemical Pioneer Award of the American Institute of Chemists. After her death, Hazen was nominated and accepted into the National Inventors Hall of Fame in 1994.
