= B. B. Mundkur =

Indian mycologist and plant pathologist (1896–1952)

Balchandra Bhavanishankar Mundkur (26 June 1896 — 13 December 1952) was an Indian mycologist and plant pathologist. He worked at the Indian Agricultural Research Institute and later as a professor of botany at the University of Poona.

Balchandra Mundkur, the surname being toponymic, was born in the village of Mundkur. After finishing high school in 1915 he joined St. Aloysius College, Mangalore and then went to Presidency College, Madras where he graduated with a BA in botany. He then joined as an agricultural officer in Bengal and from 1922 to 1928 as a mycologist at the cotton research scheme in Dharwad studying cotton wilt. He went to Iowa State University and obtained a PhD in 1930 after which he joined the Indian Agricultural Research Institute. In 1947 he founded the Indian Phytopathological Society. He published Fungi and Plant Diseases in 1949 and a monograph on the Ustilaginales of India in 1952 apart from research papers. He was elected Fellow of the Indian National Science Academy in 1946. A smut genus Mundkurella was named after him by M.J. Thirumalachar.
