= Streptomyces filipinensis =

Scientific classification
- Domain: Bacteria
- Kingdom: Bacillati
- Phylum: Actinomycetota
- Class: Actinomycetes
- Order: Streptomycetales
- Family: Streptomycetaceae
- Genus: Streptomyces
- Species: S. filipinensis

Binomial name
- Streptomyces filipinensis Ammann et al. 1955

Type strain
- AS 4.1452, ATCC 23905, BCRC 11472, CBS 309.56, CBS 801.68, CCRC 11472, CGMCC 4.1452, DSM 40112, DSM 41155, ETH 20722, ETH 28584, ETH 28594, Gottlieb 114-8, IFO 12860, IMRU 3781, ISP 5112, JCM 4369, KCC S-0369, Lanoot R-8697, LMG 19333, NBRC 12860, NRRL 2437, NRRL B-2437, NRRL-ISP 5112, R-8697, RIA 1124, UAMH 4943, VKM Ac-966

Species of bacterium

Streptomyces filipinensis is a bacterium species from the genus of Streptomyces which has been isolated from soil on the Philippines. Streptomyces filipinensis produces pentalenolactone I, hygromycin A and filipin.

== See also ==
- List of Streptomyces species
