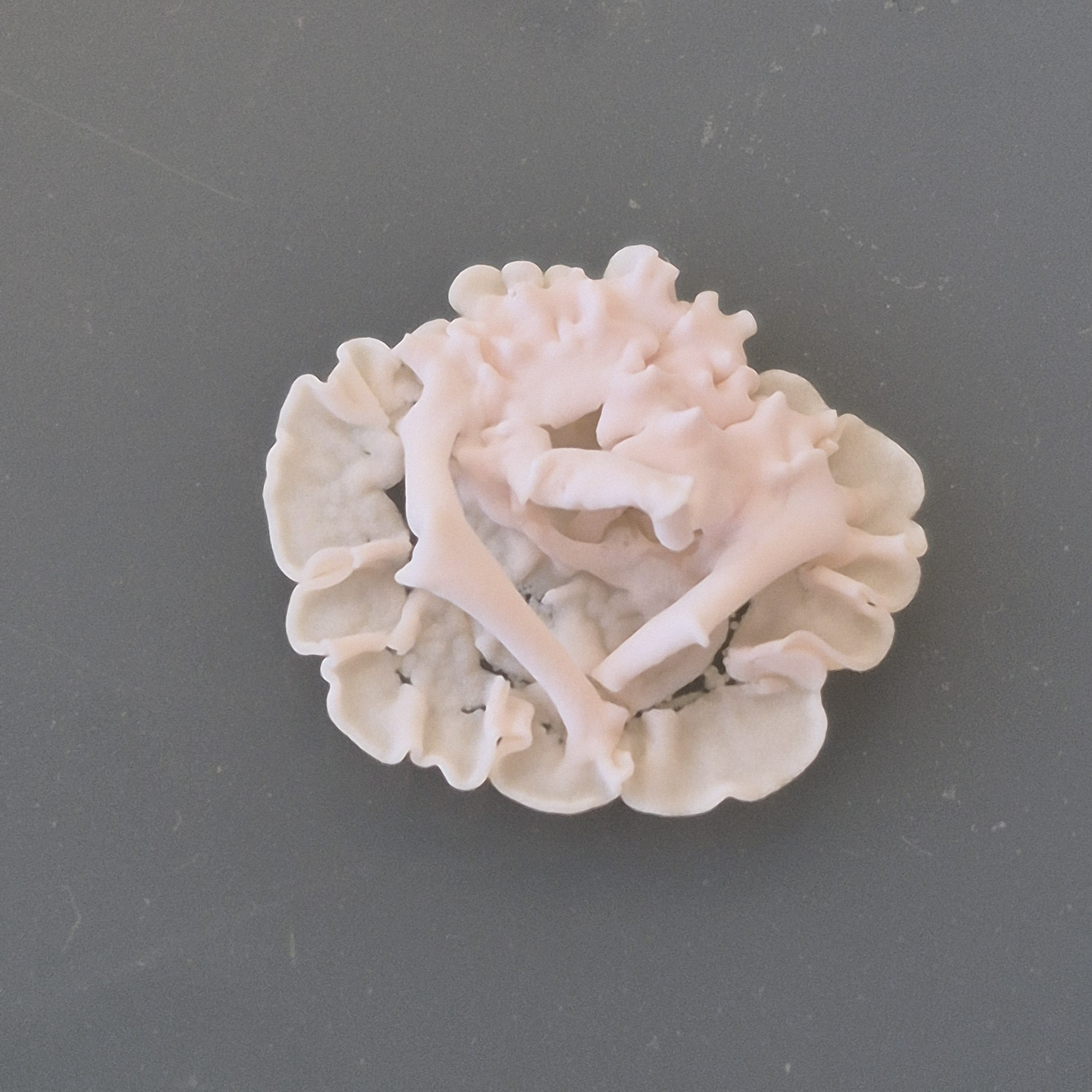
- A colony of Anthracocystis heteropogonicola isolated and growing on agar

Scientific classification
- Kingdom: Fungi
- Division: Basidiomycota
- Class: Ustilaginomycetes
- Order: Ustilaginales
- Family: Ustilaginaceae
- Genus: Anthracocystis; Bref.

Type species
- Anthracocystis destruens Bref.

= Anthracocystis =

Genus of fungus

Anthracocystis is a genus of smut fungi in the family Ustilaginaceae. The type species is Anthracocystis destruens. Until it was reinstated in 2012, Anthracocystis was considered a synonym of Sporisorium. They are mainly found in tropical areas.
