= Turletricin =

Antifungal drug

Legal status
- Legal status: In general: unscheduled

Identifiers
- CAS Number: 2761794-74-3
- PubChem CID: 170453316
- UNII: TDF5DY3ZVY

Chemical and physical data
- 3D model (JSmol): Interactive image
- SMILES: [C@H]1[C@H](C)OC(C[C@H](O)C[C@H](O)CC[C@@H](O)[C@H](O)C[C@H](O)C[C@](O2)(O)C[C@H](O)[C@@H](C(NC(CO)CO)=O)[C@@H]2C[C@@H](O[C@@H]3O[C@H](C)[C@@H](O)[C@H](N)[C@H]3O)/C=C/C=C/C=C/C=C/C=C/C=C/C=C/[C@H](C)[C@H]1O)=O
- InChI: InChI=1S/C50H80N2O18/c1-29-17-15-13-11-9-7-5-6-8-10-12-14-16-18-37(69-49-47(64)44(51)46(63)32(4)68-49)24-41-43(48(65)52-33(27-53)28-54)40(60)26-50(66,70-41)25-36(57)22-39(59)38(58)20-19-34(55)21-35(56)23-42(61)67-31(3)30(2)45(29)62/h5-18,29-41,43-47,49,53-60,62-64,66H,19-28,51H2,1-4H3,(H,52,65)/b6-5+,9-7+,10-8+,13-11+,14-12+,17-15+,18-16+/t29-,30-,31-,32+,34+,35+,36-,37-,38+,39+,40-,41-,43+,44-,45+,46+,47+,49-,50+/m0/s1; Key:DYFDQVUOYRWTOB-JYUTVPRCSA-N

Turletricin (also known as AM-2-19 and SF001) is an experimental antifungal drug based on amphotericin B (AmB) that is engineered to be less toxic to the kidneys.

Amphotericin B is a polyene that targets fungal ergosterol as well as human cholesterol, which results in kidney damage. Turletricin instead is selective to fungal ergosterol and also draws out fungal ergosterol more effectively. The investigational new drug (IND) application was filed in May 2023. Turletricin received Qualified Infectious Disease Product (QIDP) for invasive aspergillosis and Fast Track designations from the FDA in 2023. It is now under phase I trial.

An oral formulation is currently in the feasibility phase.
