= Streptomyces chattanoogensis =

Scientific classification
- Domain: Bacteria
- Kingdom: Bacillati
- Phylum: Actinomycetota
- Class: Actinomycetes
- Order: Streptomycetales
- Family: Streptomycetaceae
- Genus: Streptomyces
- Species: S. chattanoogensis

Binomial name
- Streptomyces chattanoogensis Burns and Holtman 1959

Type strain
- AS 4.1415, ATCC 13358, ATCC 19739, BCRC 13655, Burns J-23, CBS 447.68, CBS 477.68, CCRC 13655, CCTM La 2922, CECT 3321, CGMCC 100020, CGMCC 4.1415, CUB 136, DSM 40002, DSMZ 40002, Holtman J-23, IFO 12754, ISP 50002, ISP 5002, J-23, JCM 4299, JCM 4571, KCC S-0299, KCC S-0571, KCCS- 0571, KCCS-0299, KCTC 1087, Lanoot R-8703, LMG 19339, NBRC 12754, NCIB 9809, NCIMB 9809, NRRL B-2255, NRRL-ISP 5002, R-8703, RIA 1019, VKM Ac-1775, VKM Ac-1775

Species of bacterium

Streptomyces chattanoogensis is a bacterium species from the genus of Streptomyces which has been isolated from soil in Tennessee in the United States. Streptomyces chattanoogensis produces natamycin (previously called pimaricin or tennecetin).

== See also ==
- List of Streptomyces species
