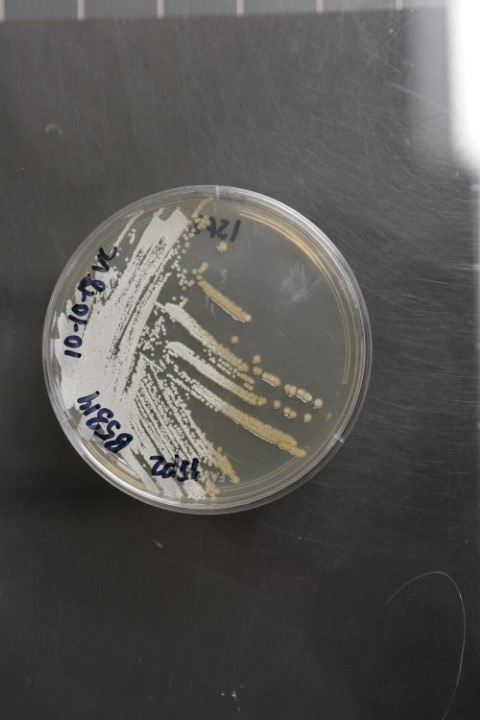

Scientific classification
- Domain: Bacteria
- Kingdom: Bacillati
- Phylum: Actinomycetota
- Class: Actinomycetia
- Order: Streptomycetales
- Family: Streptomycetaceae
- Genus: Streptomyces
- Species: S. natalensis

Binomial name
- Streptomyces natalensis Struyk et al. 1958

= Streptomyces natalensis =

Species of bacterium

Streptomyces natalensis is a bacterial species in the genus Streptomyces.

== Uses ==
Natamycin is an antifungal agent produced during fermentation by S. natalensis.
