= Mundkur =

Village in Udupi district

Coordinates: 13.130°N 74.866°E

Mundkur is a village in Karkala Taluk, Udupi district, Karnataka, India. The Durga Parameshwari temple located here was built circa 9th century AD.

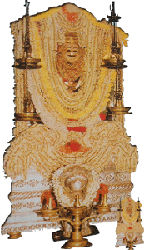
Sri Durga Parameshwari, Mundkur

== Deities ==
The prime deity is Sri Durgaparameshwari in the form of Mahishamardini, holding the demon Mahisha upside down and piercing thrishul on his body. Hence the name Mundakke oori nintha OOru became Mundkur in the later stage as per one version. Other deities being worshiped are Sri MahaGanapathi (Kshipraprasaada swaroopi), Navagraha, Naaga, AshwaththaVriksha, Dhoomavathi, Raktheshwari, Vyaghra Chamundi (Pilichandi), Vaarahi (Panjurli), and Rakshopi Devatha (Protector from evil Spirits) in the temple. Photos of Sri Madhvacharya, Sri Vadiraja swamiji, Sri Raghavendra Swamiji, and Sri Bhootharaja are installed in Sri Madhva Mandira, where bhajans and poojas are held regularly.
