= Nystatin =

Antifungal medication

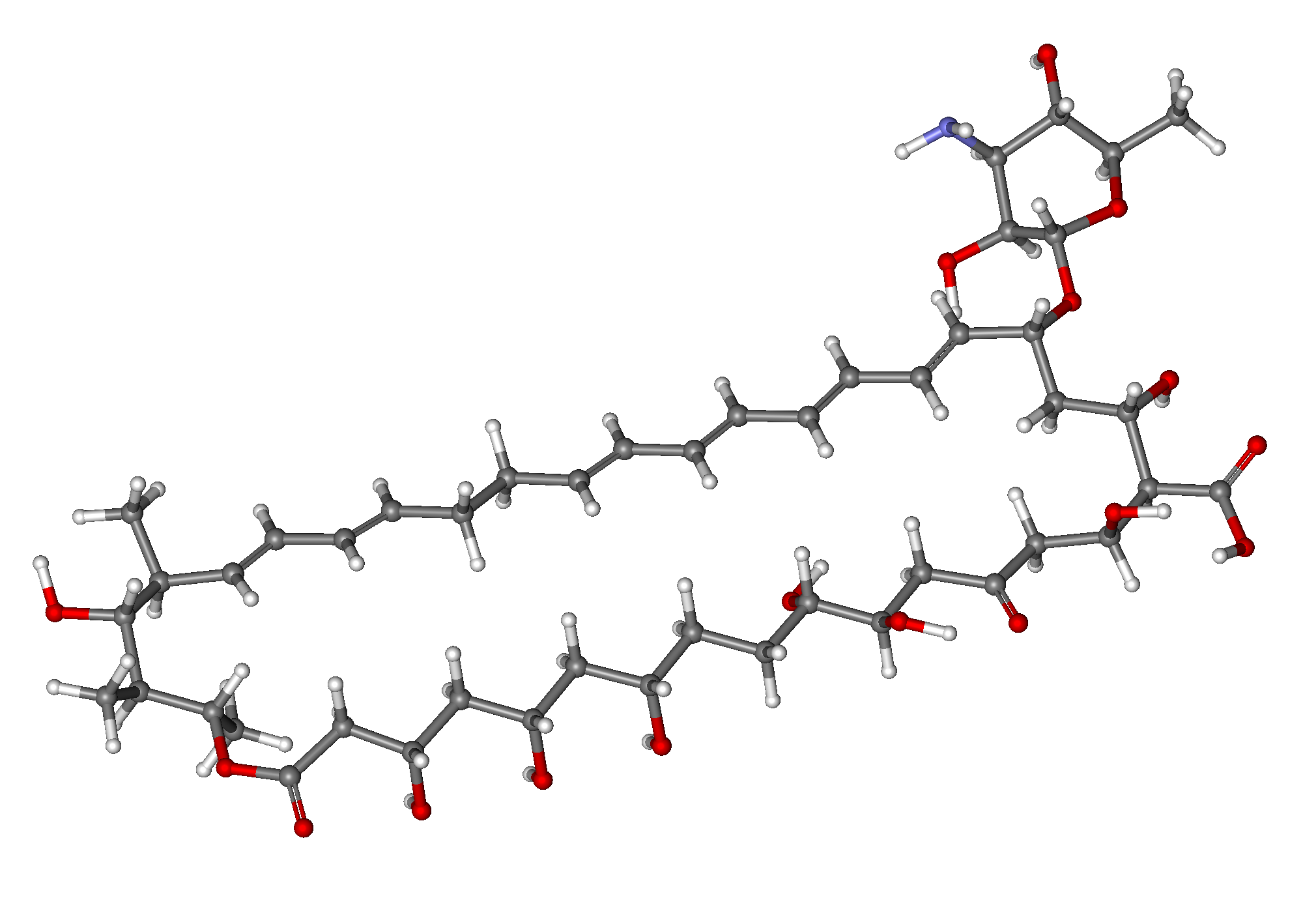

Clinical data
- Trade names: Mycostatin, others
- AHFS/Drugs.com: Monograph
- MedlinePlus: a682758
- License data: US DailyMed: Nystatin
- Routes of administration: Topical, vaginal, by mouth
- Drug class: Polyene antifungal medication
- ATC code: A07AA02 (WHO) D01AA01 (WHO), G01AA01 (WHO), J01RA19 (WHO)

Legal status
- Legal status: In general: ℞ (Prescription only)

Pharmacokinetic data
- Bioavailability: 0% on oral ingestion
- Metabolism: None (not extensively absorbed)
- Elimination half-life: Dependent upon GI transit time
- Excretion: Fecal (100%)

Identifiers
- IUPAC name: (1S,3R,4R,7R,9R,11R,15S,16R,17R,18S,19E,21E, 25E,27E,29E,31E,33R,35S,36R,37S)-33-[(3-amino-3,6-dideoxy-β-L-mannopyranosyl)oxy]-1, 3,4,7,9,11,17,37-octahydroxy-15,16,18-trimethyl-13-oxo-14, 39-dioxabicyclo[33.3.1]nonatriaconta-19,21,25,27,29,31-hexaene-36-carboxylic acid
- CAS Number: 1400-61-9
- PubChem CID: 14960
- DrugBank: DB00646
- ChemSpider: 23078586
- UNII: BDF1O1C72E
- KEGG: D00202
- ChEBI: CHEBI:473992
- ChEMBL: ChEMBL229383
- NIAID ChemDB: 004993
- CompTox Dashboard (EPA): DTXSID4040688
- ECHA InfoCard: 100.014.317

Chemical and physical data
- Formula: C_{47}H_{75}NO_{17}
- Molar mass: 926.107 g·mol^{−1}
- 3D model (JSmol): Interactive image
- Melting point: 44–46 °C (111–115 °F)
- SMILES: CC1C=CC=CCCC=CC=CC=CC=CC(CC2C(C(CC(O2)(CC(C(CCC(CC(CC(CC(=O)OC(C(C1O)C)C)O)O)O)O)O)O)O)C(=O)O)OC3C(C(C(C(O3)C)O)N)O
- InChI: InChI=1S/C47H75NO17/c1-27-17-15-13-11-9-7-5-6-8-10-12-14-16-18-34(64-46-44(58)41(48)43(57)30(4)63-46)24-38-40(45(59)60)37(54)26-47(61,65-38)25-36(53)35(52)20-19-31(49)21-32(50)22-33(51)23-39(55)62-29(3)28(2)42(27)56/h5-6,8,10-18,27-38,40-44,46,49-54,56-58,61H,7,9,19-26,48H2,1-4H3,(H,59,60)/b6-5+,10-8+,13-11+,14-12+,17-15+,18-16+/t27-,28-,29-,30+,31+,32+,33+,34-,35+,36+,37-,38-,40+,41-,42+,43+,44-,46-,47+/m0/s1; Key:VQOXZBDYSJBXMA-NQTDYLQESA-N

Nystatin, sold under the brand name Mycostatin among others, is an antifungal medication. It is used to treat Candida infections of the skin including diaper rash, thrush, esophageal candidiasis, and vaginal yeast infections. It may also be used to prevent candidiasis in those who are at high risk. Nystatin may be used by mouth, in the vagina, or applied to the skin.

Common side effects when applied to the skin include burning, itching, and a rash. Common side effects when taken by mouth include vomiting and diarrhea. During pregnancy use in the vagina is safe while other formulations have not been studied in this group. It works by disrupting the cell membrane of the fungal cells.

Nystatin was discovered in 1950 by Rachel Fuller Brown and Elizabeth Lee Hazen. It was the first polyene macrolide antifungal. It is on the World Health Organization's List of Essential Medicines. It is available as a generic medication. It is made from the bacterium Streptomyces noursei. In 2023, it was the 233rd most commonly prescribed medication in the United States, with more than 1 million prescriptions.

== Medical uses ==
Skin, vaginal, mouth, and esophageal Candida infections usually respond well to treatment with nystatin. Infections of nails or hyperkeratinized skin do not respond well.

When given parenterally (that is, other routes besides oral/topical/vaginal), its activity is reduced due to presence of plasma.

Oral nystatin is often used as a preventive treatment in people who are at risk for fungal infections, such as AIDS patients with a low CD4^{+} count and people receiving chemotherapy. It has been investigated for use in patients after liver transplantation, but fluconazole was found to be much more effective for preventing colonization, invasive infection, and death. It is effective in treating oral candidiasis in elderly people who wear dentures.

It is also used in very low birth-weight (less than 1500 g or 3 lb 5oz o) infants to prevent invasive fungal infections, although fluconazole is the preferred treatment. It has been found to reduce the rate of invasive fungal infections and also reduce deaths when used in these babies.

Liposomal nystatin is not commercially available, but investigational use has shown greater in vitro activity than colloidal formulations of amphotericin B, and demonstrated effectiveness against some amphotericin B-resistant forms of fungi. It offers an intriguing possibility for difficult-to-treat systemic infections, such as invasive aspergillosis, or infections that demonstrate resistance to amphotericin B. Cryptococcus is also sensitive to nystatin. Additionally, liposomal nystatin appears to cause fewer cases of and less severe nephrotoxicity than observed with amphotericin B.

== Adverse effects ==
Bitter taste and nausea are more common than most other adverse effects.

The oral suspension form produces a number of adverse effects including but not limited to:

1. Diarrhea
2. Abdominal pain
3. Rarely, tachycardia, bronchospasm, facial swelling, muscle aches

Both the oral suspension and the topical form can cause:

1. Hypersensitivity reactions, including Stevens–Johnson syndrome in some cases
2. Rash, itching, burning and acute generalized exanthematous pustulosis

Too high of a dosage can potentially lead to additional side effects such as:

1. Nephrotoxicity
2. Hypokalemia
3. Chills and skin rash

== Mechanism of action ==
Like amphotericin B and natamycin, nystatin is an ionophore. It binds to ergosterol, a major component of the fungal cell membrane. When present in sufficient concentrations, it forms pores in the membrane that lead to K^{+} leakage, acidification, and death of the fungus. Ergosterol is a sterol unique to fungi, so the drug does not have such catastrophic effects on animals or plants. However, many of the systemic/toxic effects of nystatin in humans are attributable to its binding to mammalian sterols, namely cholesterol. This is the effect that accounts for the nephrotoxicity observed when high serum levels of nystatin are achieved. Despite the molecular similarities and differences of ergosterol and cholesterol, there is currently no consensus as to why nystatin has a higher binding affinity for ergosterol because it remains unclear how the nystatin pores are formed. Researchers have concluded thus far that nystatin pores are formed from 4-12 nystatin molecules, with an unknown number of the necessary sterol interactions.

Nystatin also impacts cell membrane potential and transport by lipid peroxidation. Conjugated double bonds in nystatin's structure steal electron density from ergosterol in fungal cell membranes. Lipid peroxidation alters the hydrophilicity of the interior of channels in the membrane, which is necessary to transport ions and polar molecules. Disruption of membrane transport from nystatin results in rapid cell death. Lipid peroxidation by nystatin also contributes significantly to K^{+} leakage due to structural modifications of the membrane.

== Biosynthesis ==
Nystatin A_{1} (often called nystatin) is biosynthesized by a bacterial strain, Streptomyces noursei. The structure of this active compound is characterized as a polyene macrolide with a deoxysugar D-mycosamine, an aminoglycoside. The genomic sequence of nystatin reveals the presence of the polyketide loading module (nysA), six polyketide syntheses modules (nysB, nysC, nysI, nysJ, and nysK) and two thioesterase modules (nysK and nysE). It is evident that the biosynthesis of the macrolide functionality follows the polyketide synthase I pathway.

Following the biosynthesis of the macrolide, the compound undergoes post-synthetic modifications, which are aided by the following enzymes: GDP-mannose dehydratase (nysIII), P450 monooxygenase (nysL and nysN), aminotransferase (nysDII), and glycosyltransferase (nysDI). The biosynthetic pathway is thought to proceed as shown to yield nystatin.

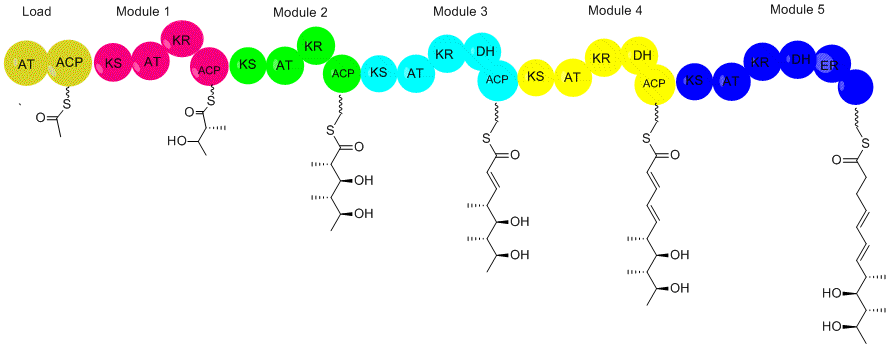
Loading to 5

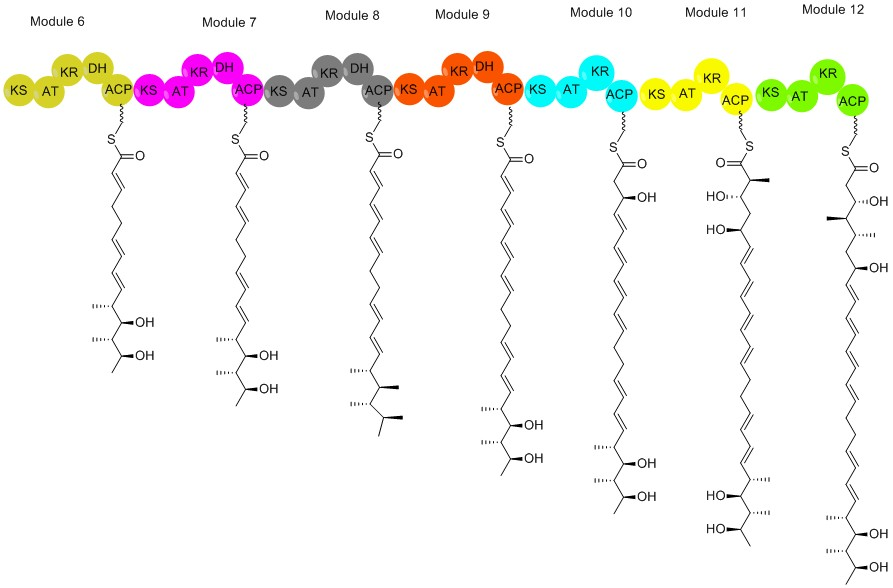
Modules 6–12

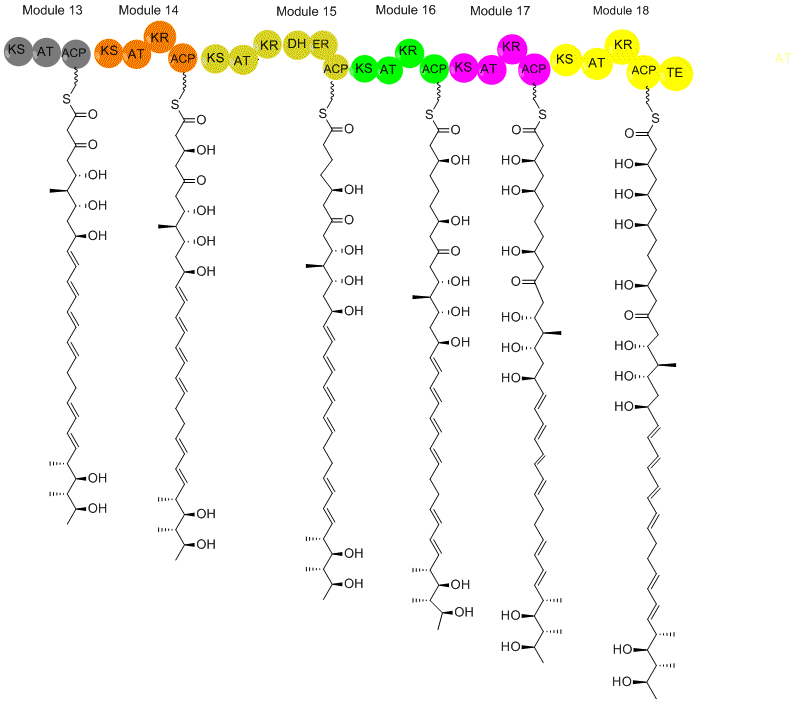
Modules 13 -18

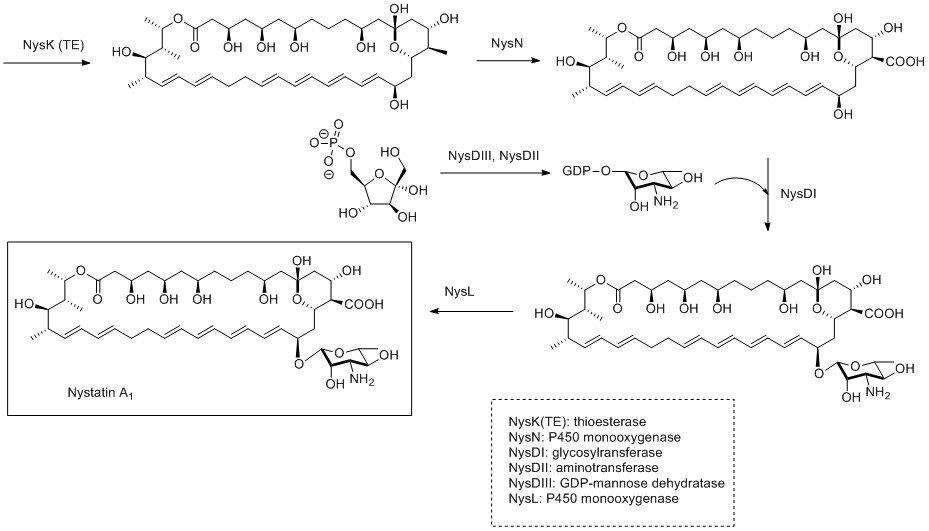
Completed molecule

The melting point of nystatin is 44 - 46 °C.

== History ==
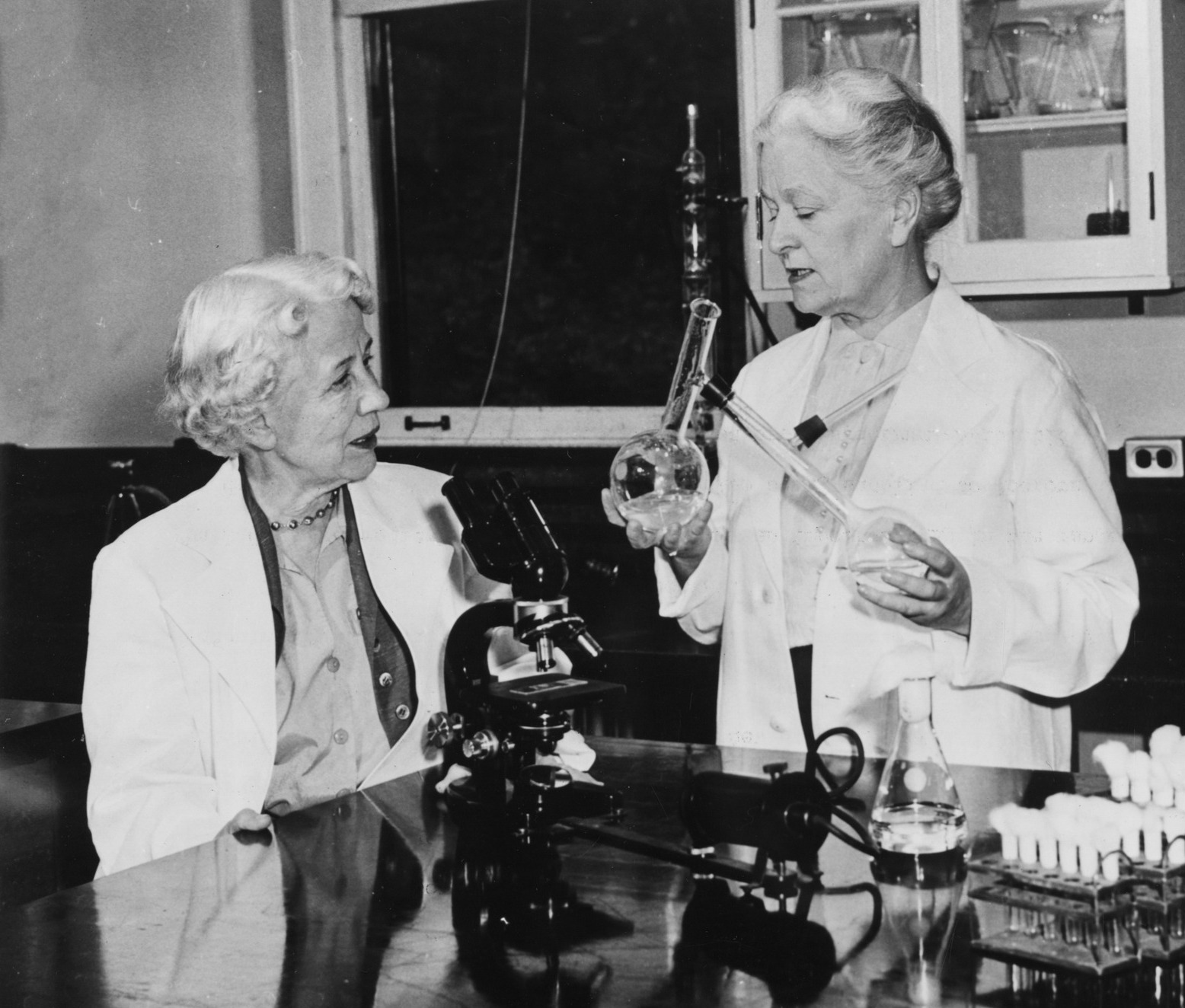
Elizabeth Lee Hazen (left) and Rachel Fuller Brown in 1955.

Like many other antifungals and antibiotics, nystatin has bacterial origin. It was isolated from Streptomyces noursei in 1950 by Elizabeth Lee Hazen and Rachel Fuller Brown, who were doing research for the Division of Laboratories and Research of the New York State Department of Health. Hazen found a promising micro-organism in the soil of a friend's dairy farm. She named it Streptomyces noursei, after Jessie Nourse, the wife of the farm's owner. Hazen and Brown named nystatin after the New York State Health Department in 1954. The two discoverers patented the drug, and then donated the $13 million in profits to a foundation to fund similar research.

== Other uses ==
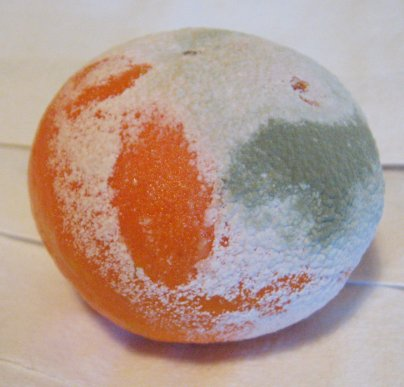
Penicillium-infected tangerine: The spot absent of growth had nystatin applied to it before the fungus covered the fruit.

=== In cellular biology ===
It is also used in cellular biology as an inhibitor of the lipid raft-caveolae endocytosis pathway on mammalian cells, at concentrations around 3 μg/ml.

Nystatin is also used as a tool by scientists performing "perforated" patch-clamp electrophysiological recordings of cells. When loaded in the recording pipette, it allows for measurement of electrical currents without washing out the intracellular contents, because it forms pores in the cell membrane that are permeable to only monovalent ions, preferably cations such as sodium, potassium, lithium, and cesium.

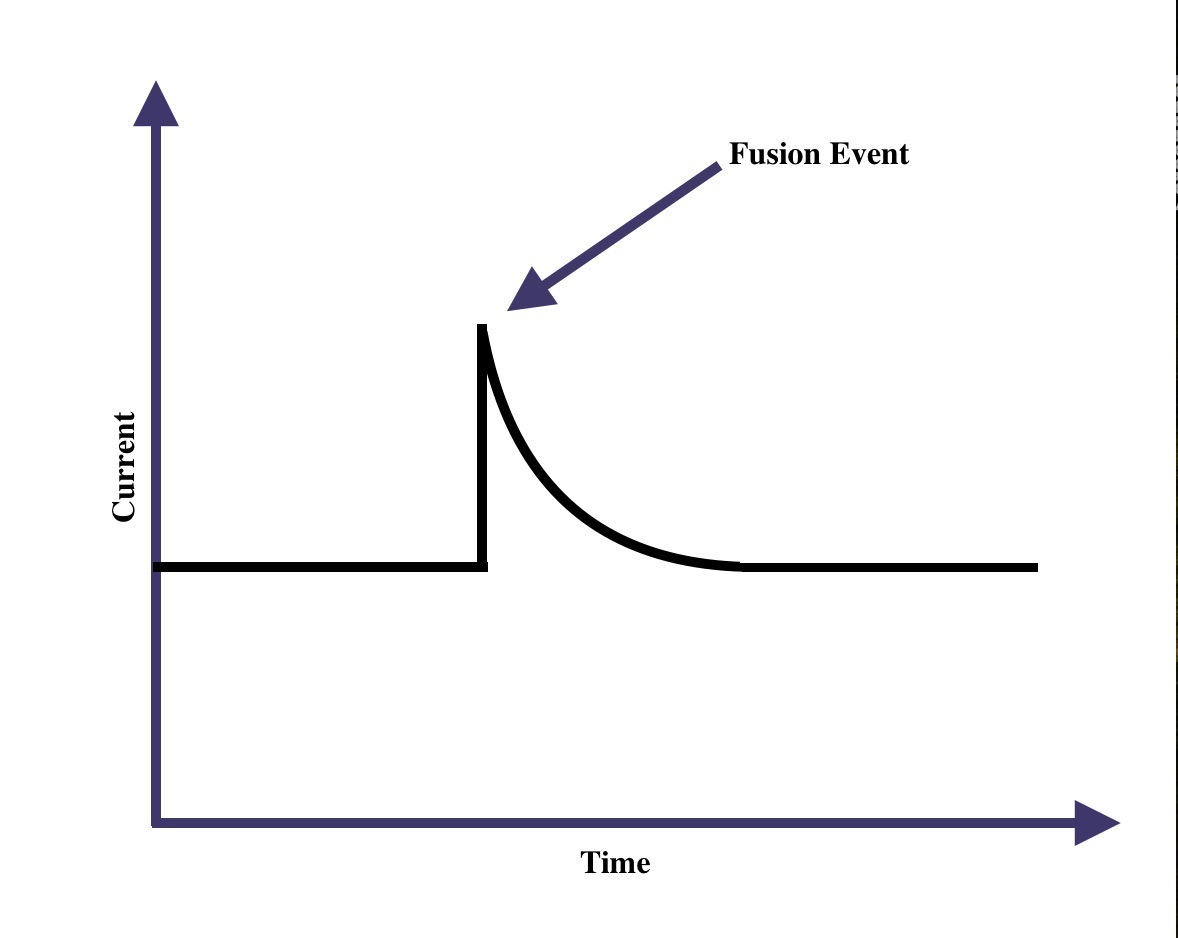
This is a depiction of what a fusion event may look like when seen on a current measurement. There is a sudden jump in the current, followed by a slower recover as the current returns to its baseline measurement from before the fusion event. This fusion event would interrupt the stability of a nystatin pore.

Another electrophysiological measurement that can be made is fusion event duration in a nystatin-ergosterol based system. Fusions are measured while the voltage is held constant, and is characterized by a spike in the current that then returns to the baseline current as the nystatin channels close. When present in smaller concentrations, nystatin momentarily forms pores that allows a vesicle fusion to occur more easily; that fusion then interrupts the pore stability and the nystatin and ergosterol disperse from each other. Conversely, researchers have found that the half-life of these nystatin pores increase with an increased dosage level of nystatin to the membrane systems. This indicates a lower energy of both the lipid membrane and the ionophores when there is a higher concentration of nystatin.

=== Anti-mold ===
In certain cases, a nystatin derivative has been used to prevent the spread of mold on objects such as works of art. For example, it was applied to wood panel paintings damaged as a result of the Arno River Flood of 1966 in Florence, Italy.

== Formulations ==
- An oral suspension form is used for the prophylaxis or treatment of oropharyngeal thrush, a superficial candidal infection of the mouth and pharynx.
- A tablet form is preferred for candidal infections in the intestines.
- Nystatin is available as a topical cream and can be used for superficial candidal infections of the skin.
- Additionally, a liposomal formulation of nystatin was investigated in the 1980s and into the early 21st century. The liposomal form was intended to resolve problems arising from the poor solubility of the parent molecule and the associated systemic toxicity of the free drug.
- Nystatin pastilles have been shown to be more effective in treating oral candidiasis than nystatin suspensions.

Due to its toxicity profile when high levels in the serum are obtained, no injectable formulations of nystatin are on the US market. However, injectable formulations have been investigated in the past.

== Brand names ==
- Nyamyc
- Pedi-Dri
- Pediaderm AF Complete
- Candistatin
- Cazetin (oral drop)
- Nyaderm
- Bio-Statin
- PMS-Nystatin
- Nystan (oral tablets, topical ointment, and pessaries, formerly from Bristol-Myers Squibb)
- Infestat
- Nystalocal from Medinova AG
- Nystamont
- Nystop (topical powder, Paddock Labs)
- Nystex
- Mykinac
- Nysert (vaginal suppositories, Procter & Gamble)
- Nystaform (topical cream, and ointment and cream combined with iodochlorhydroxyquine and hydrocortisone; formerly Bayer now Typharm Ltd)
- Nilstat (vaginal tablet, oral drops, Lederle)
- Kandistatin (oral drop)
- Korostatin (vaginal tablets, Holland Rantos)
- Mycostatin (vaginal tablets, topical powder, suspension Bristol-Myers Squibb)
- Mycolog-II (topical ointment, combined with triamcinolone; Apothecon)
- Mytrex (topical ointment, combined with triamcinolone)
- Mykacet (topical ointment, combined with triamcinolone)
- Myco-Triacet II (topical ointment, combined with triamcinolone)
- Flagystatin II (cream, combined with metronidazole)
- Timodine (cream, combined with hydrocortisone and dimethicone)
- Nistatina (oral tablets, Antibiotice Iaşi)
- Nidoflor (cream, combined with neomycin sulfate and triamcinolone acetonide)
- Stamicin (oral tablets, Antibiotice Iaşi)
- Lystin
- Animax (veterinary topical ointment or cream; combined with neomycin sulfate, thiostrepton and triamcinolone acetonide)
- Nyata (topical powder)
