= Rachel Fuller Brown =

American chemist (1898–1980)

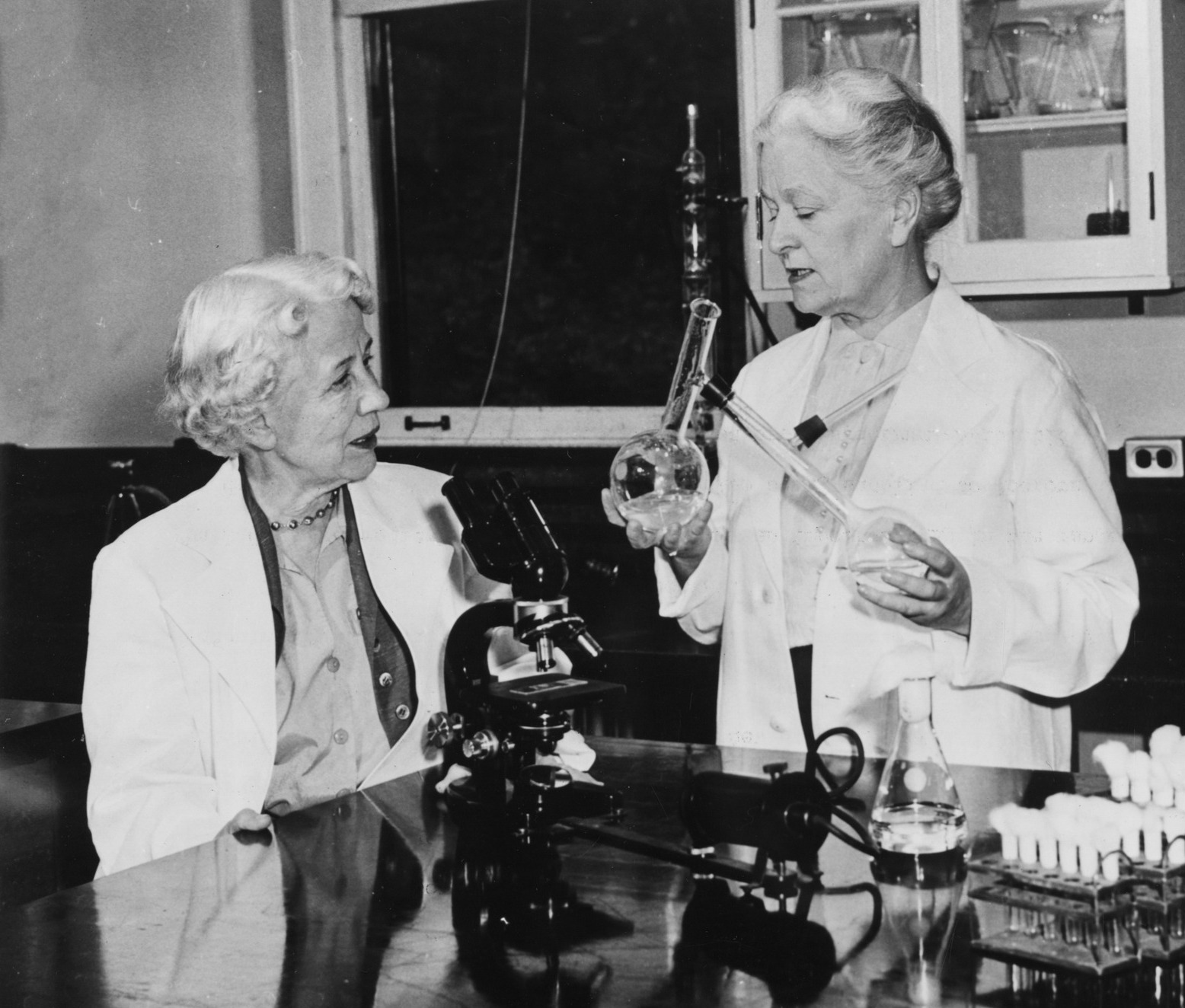
- Elizabeth Lee Hazen and Brown (right)
- Born: 23 November 1898; Springfield, Massachusetts
- Died: 14 January 1980 (aged 81); Albany, New York
- Education: University of Chicago
- Known for: Co-discovery of antifungal agent nystatin with Elizabeth Lee Hazen
- Awards: Quibb Award in Chemotherapy (1955); Rhoda Benham Award of the Medical Mycological Society of the Americas (1972); American Institute of Chemists’ Chemical Pioneer Award (1975); National Inventors Hall of Fame Inductee (1994)
- Scientific career
- Fields: Organic chemistry bacteriology

Rachel Fuller Brown (November 23, 1898 – January 14, 1980) was an American chemist best known for her long-distance collaboration with microbiologist Elizabeth Lee Hazen in developing the first useful antifungal antibiotic, nystatin, while doing research for the Division of Laboratories and Research of the New York State Department of Health. Brown received her BA from Mount Holyoke College and her PhD from the University of Chicago. She was inducted into the National Inventors Hall of Fame in 1994.

Nystatin, still produced today under various trade names, not only cures a variety of potentially devastating fungal infections, but has also been used to combat Dutch Elm disease in trees and to restore artwork damaged by water and mold.

== Life ==
On November 23, 1898, Rachel Fuller Brown was born in Springfield, Massachusetts. When she was 14 years old, her father left the family. Rachel went to Commercial High School, but later switched to Central High School because her mother wanted her to have a more traditional education. Henriette F. Dexter, a friend of Rachel’s grandmother, saw how determined Rachel was to go to college and paid for her to attend Mount Holyoke College. She majored in chemistry and earned her BA in chemistry and history in 1920. Eventually, she earned an MS in organic chemistry from the University of Chicago. After taking some courses at Harvard, Brown came back to the University of Chicago for more graduate work. She submitted her PhD thesis, but there were complications and she had to leave Chicago before receiving PhD. She found a job at the Division of Laboratories and Research in New York. The Division of Laboratories and Research was known for its research in creating vaccines and antiserums. Brown worked there for 7 years and then returned to Chicago to receive her PhD.

In 1948, Brown began a project with Elizabeth Lee Hazen, who was researching fungi and bacteria. This project led them to discover an antibiotic that fought fungal infections. In the 1930s, antibiotics were becoming more popular to fight bacteria, but a side effect was that the antibiotics caused fungus to grow. The antibiotics were so strong, they killed all the bacteria, including the healthy bacteria; this left no bacteria to control the fungus. The fungus caused sore mouths or stomach pain. Other fungi attacked the central nervous system and caused ringworm and athlete’s foot. However, there were no medications to fight fungal diseases.

Elizabeth cultured organisms found in soil and tested them to fight against fungi. If there was good activity, she would send it to Rachel in a mason jar. Brown would isolate the active agent in the culture, which could be used to cure fungal diseases. After testing hundreds of soil samples that were highly toxic to animals and not safe for humans, the two women found a culture that could work for animals. They discovered that this microorganism produced two antifungal substances. One of these was too toxic for test animals, but the other one was promising. They named the drug Nystatin. Nystatin was the first antifungal antibiotic that was safe for humans. It could be combined with antibacterial drugs to help with side effects. Nystatin was also effective in stopping the growth of fungi on works of art in Italy that were damaged by flooding. In 1950, Brown and Hazen showed their work at the National Academy of Sciences, and in 1954, the drug was made for human use.

== Later years ==
In 1951, the Department of Health and Laboratories promoted Brown to associate biochemist. Brown and Hazen, in continuing their research, discovered two additional antibiotics—phalmycin and capacidin. The two continued to work closely together in making additional minor contributions to the field of bacteriology until their retirement.

Brown died on January 14, 1980, aged 81, in Albany, New York.

== Awards and recognition ==
Royalties for nystatin totaled $13.4 million. Brown and Hazen chose to donate the money to the Research Corporation, which had helped them obtain the patent. The Research Corporation used half for grants to further scientific research and the other half to support what became known as the Brown-Hazen Fund.

Both Brown and Hazen received many awards for their collaborative work, the first major prize being the Squibb Award in Chemotherapy in 1955. Brown was also elected a fellow of the New York Academy of Sciences in 1957. On Brown’s retirement in 1968, she received the Distinguished Service Award of the New York Department of Health. In 1972, she was also given the Rhoda Benham Award of the Medical Mycological Society of the Americas. Brown and Hazen were the first women ever to receive, in 1975, the American Institute of Chemists’ Chemical Pioneer Award.

Brown and Hazan were inducted into the National Inventors Hall of Fame in 1994, the second and third women members, after Gertrude Belle Elion.

== Philanthropy ==
Brown was a member of St. Peter’s Episcopal Church since from her arrival in Albany. There she met Dorothy Wakerley, a woman who became her lifelong friend and companion. They shared a house, and like many other unmarried women during their time, they cared for an extended family over the years. They lived with Brown’s grandmother, mother, and various nieces and nephews. Brown also invited a succession of visiting women scientists from China. Brown continued her active community life in retirement, becoming the first female vestry, or administrative member, of her Episcopalian church. She also taught at Sunday school for many years.

Between 1957 and 1978, the Research Corporation's Brown-Hazen Fund supported training and research in biomedical sciences and encouraged women to take up careers in science. For several years the fund was the largest single source of non-federal funds for medical mycology in the United States.

For over fifty years, Brown was also an active member of the American Association of University Women, strongly supporting the participation of women in science.

By the time of her death, Brown had not only paid back Henriette Dexter, the who made it possible for her to attend college, but, the money she earned from royalties allowed her to create new funds for scientific research and scholarships to provide other scientists with the same opportunities.

In a statement published in The Chemist the month of her death, Brown said she hoped for a future of "equal opportunities and accomplishments for all scientists regardless of sex."
