= Mycosamine =

D-Mycosamine
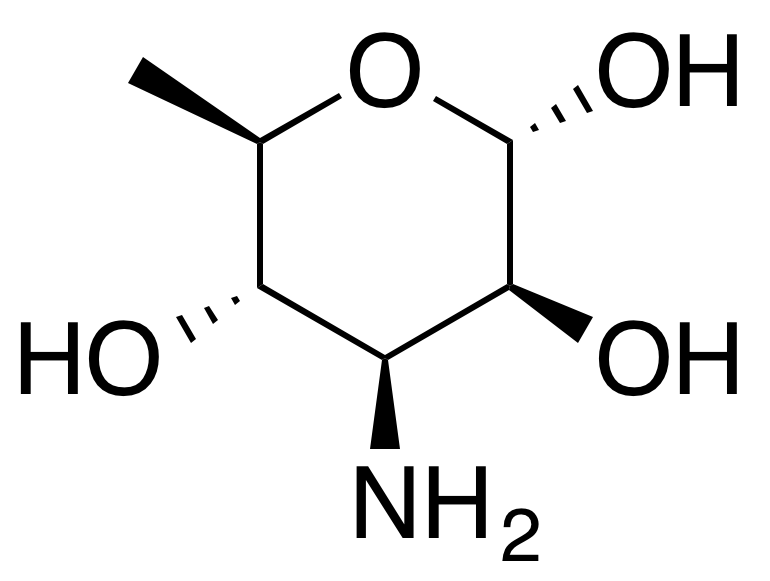

Names
- IUPAC name 3-Amino-3,6-dideoxy-β-D-mannopyranose
- Other names: 3-amino-3,6-dideoxy-α-D-manno-hexopyranose; (2S,3S,4S,5S,6R)-4-amino-6-methyloxane-2,3,5-triol; 3-amino-3-desoxy-D-rhamnose

Identifiers
CAS Number	32817-12-2
3D model (JSmol)	Interactive image
ChemSpider	16735923
PubChem CID	101343655
UNII	1KHW2634R4
CompTox Dashboard (EPA)	DTXSID00954473
- InChI: InChI=1S/C6H13NO4/c1-2-4(8)3(7)5(9)6(10)11-2/h2-6,8-10H,7H2,1H3/t2-,3+,4-,5+,6+/m1/s1 Key: OINCELAOJGBMQV-RDQKPOQOSA-N
- SMILES: C[C@@H]1[C@H]([C@@H]([C@@H]([C@H](O1)O)O)N)O

Properties
Chemical formula	C_{6}H_{13}NO_{4}
Molar mass	163.173 g·mol^{−1}
- Except where otherwise noted, data are given for materials in their standard state (at 25 °C [77 °F], 100 kPa). Infobox references

D-Mycosamine is an amino sugar found in several polyene antimycotics. Structural analogs of these agents lacking this monosaccharide component do not exhibit substantial antifungal activity.
