= Hindustan Antibiotics =

Indian Pharmaceutical company

Hindustan Antibiotics Limited
- Company type: Central Public Sector Undertaking
- Industry: Pharmaceuticals
- Founded: 10 March 1954
- Headquarters: Pimpri, Pune, India
- Key people: Mrs.Neerja saraf(MD & CEO)
- Products: Antibiotics like Penicillin; Streptomycin; Gentamicin; Amoxycillin
- Revenue: USD 12 million (FY)
- Owner: Ministry of Chemicals and Fertilizers, Government of India
- Number of employees: 1,500
- Website: www.hindantibiotics.in

Hindustan Antibiotics Limited (HAtL) is an Indian central public sector undertaking under the ownership of Ministry of Chemicals and Fertilizers, Government of India. It is based in Pune, India. It is the first government-owned-drug manufacturer in India. It was the first to launch a recombinant DNA product, rHU-Erythropoietin (Hemax) in 1993.

It introduced new products like Halpen, Haltax, Hexpan in 2008. Sati-HIV drugs will be produced from September 2009.

== History ==
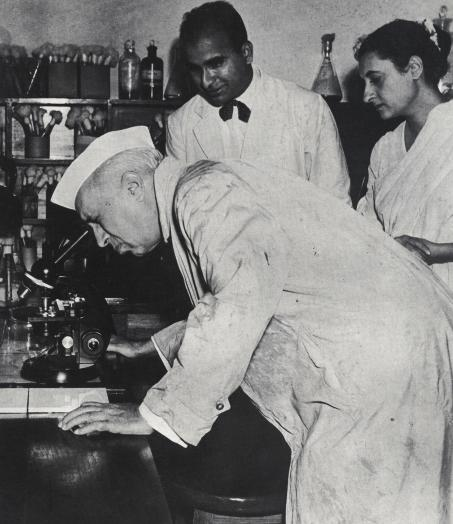
India's first Prime Minister Jawaharlal Nehru with Indira Gandhi at the Penicillin Factory in Pimpri, 1956

HAtL was set up in cooperation with the WHO and UNICEF with the social objective of providing affordable drugs throughout India. It was inaugurated by India's first Prime Minister Jawaharlal Nehru on 10 March 1954. Production began in 1955. It was based on Mahatma Gandhi's vision that the poor in India should get medicines at affordable rates.

After reporting an operating loss in 1997 the company was reported to the Bureau of Industrial and Financial Restructuring (BIFR). On 17 January 2009 the company was taken off the books of the BIFR after reporting a record turnover of ₹ 120 crore (US$24 million).

== Operations ==
Although the company's primary objective was to develop drugs for the health-care industry, the company has now diversified into the agricultural and veterinary areas as well. The manufacturing plant located in Pimpri has facilities to produce bulk drugs (capacity 60 MMU annually) as well as formulations in various dosage forms – injectables (132 million vials), capsules (250 million), tablets (120 million), large volume parentrals (12 million bottles annually), liquid orals, etc.

== In-house developed products ==
=== Health care ===
- Hamycin (own research product)
- Ampicillin Sodium
- Benzyl Penicillin Potassium
- Benzyl Penicillin Sodium
- Benzathine Penicillin (Longacillin)
- Cefuroxime Sodium
- Amoxycillin Trihydrate (Delamin)
- Cefotaxime Sodium (Haltax)
- Ceftriaxone Sodium (Haxone)
- Meropenem (Halpen)

=== Agricultural and veterinary ===
- Aureofungin (anti-fungal used in preservation of the fruits and vegetables)
- Humaur (bio-organic foliar spray)
- Streptocycline (antibacterial for effective control of diseases in plants)
- Azotomeal
- Phosphomeal
