= Amphotericin B =

Antifungal and antiparasitaric chemical compound

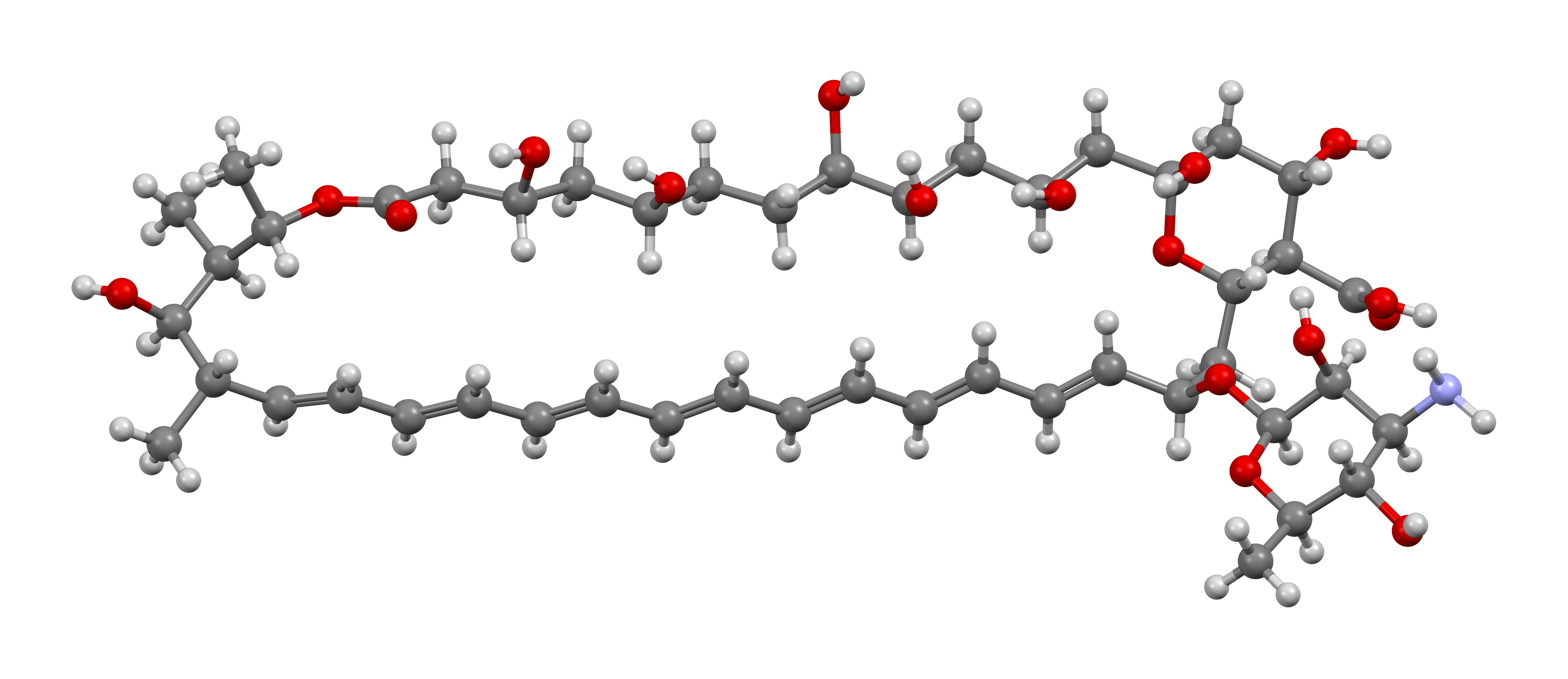

Clinical data
- Trade names: Fungizone, Mysteclin-F, AmBisome and other
- AHFS/Drugs.com: Monograph
- MedlinePlus: a682643
- License data: US DailyMed: Amphotericin_B
- Pregnancy category: AU: B2
- Routes of administration: Intravenous infusion
- ATC code: A01AB04 (WHO) A07AA07 (WHO), G01AA03 (WHO), J02AA01 (WHO)

Legal status
- Legal status: US: ℞-only; In general: ℞ (Prescription only)

Pharmacokinetic data
- Bioavailability: 100% (IV) low (oral)
- Metabolism: kidney
- Elimination half-life: Initial phase: 24 hours; Second phase: approximately 15 days
- Excretion: 40% found in urine after single cumulated over several days; Biliary excretion is also important

Identifiers
- IUPAC name: (1R,3S,5R,6R,9R, 11R,15S,16R,17R,18S,19E,21E, 23E,25E,27E,29E,31E,33R,35S,36R,37S)- 33-[(3-amino- 3,6-dideoxy- β-D-mannopyranosyl)oxy]- 1,3,5,6,9,11,17,37-octahydroxy- 15,16,18-trimethyl- 13-oxo- 14,39-dioxabicyclo [33.3.1] nonatriaconta- 19,21,23,25,27,29,31-heptaene- 36-carboxylic acid
- CAS Number: 1397-89-3
- PubChem CID: 5280965
- DrugBank: DB00681
- ChemSpider: 10237579
- UNII: 7XU7A7DROE
- KEGG: D00203
- ChEBI: CHEBI:2682
- ChEMBL: ChEMBL267345
- NIAID ChemDB: 000096
- CompTox Dashboard (EPA): DTXSID9022601
- ECHA InfoCard: 100.014.311

Chemical and physical data
- Formula: C_{47}H_{73}NO_{17}
- Molar mass: 924.091 g·mol^{−1}
- 3D model (JSmol): Interactive image
- Melting point: 170 °C (338 °F)
- SMILES: O=C(O)[C@@H]3[C@@H](O)C[C@@]2(O)C[C@@H](O)C[C@@H](O)[C@H](O)CC[C@@H](O)C[C@@H](O)CC(=O)O[C@@H](C)[C@H](C)[C@H](O)[C@@H](C)C=CC=CC=CC=CC=CC=CC=C[C@H](O[C@@H]1O[C@H](C)[C@@H](O)[C@H](N)[C@@H]1O)C[C@@H]3O2
- InChI: InChI=1S/C47H73NO17/c1-27-17-15-13-11-9-7-5-6-8-10-12-14-16-18-34(64-46-44(58)41(48)43(57)30(4)63-46)24-38-40(45(59)60)37(54)26-47(61,65-38)25-33(51)22-36(53)35(52)20-19-31(49)21-32(50)23-39(55)62-29(3)28(2)42(27)56/h5-18,27-38,40-44,46,49-54,56-58,61H,19-26,48H2,1-4H3,(H,59,60)/b6-5+,9-7+,10-8+,13-11+,14-12+,17-15+,18-16+/t27-,28-,29-,30+,31+,32+,33-,34-,35+,36+,37-,38-,40+,41-,42+,43+,44-,46-,47+/m0/s1; Key:APKFDSVGJQXUKY-INPOYWNPSA-N

Amphotericin B is an antifungal medication used for serious fungal infections and leishmaniasis. The fungal infections it is used to treat include mucormycosis, aspergillosis, blastomycosis, candidiasis, coccidioidomycosis, and cryptococcosis. It is sometimes used as a drug of last resort for primary amoebic meningoencephalitis. For certain infections it is given with flucytosine. It is typically given intravenously.

Common side effects include a reaction with fever, chills, and headaches soon after the medication is given, as well as kidney problems. Allergic symptoms including anaphylaxis may occur. Other serious side effects include low blood potassium and myocarditis (inflammation of the heart). It appears to be relatively safe in pregnancy. There is a lipid formulation that has a lower risk of side effects. It is in the polyene class of medications and works in part by interfering with the cell membrane of the fungus.

Amphotericin B was isolated from Streptomyces nodosus in 1955 at the Squibb Institute for Medical Research from cultures isolated from the streptomycete obtained from the river bed of Orinoco in that region of Venezuela and came into medical use in 1958. It is on the World Health Organization's List of Essential Medicines. It is available as a generic medication.

== Medical uses ==
=== Antifungal ===
One of the main uses of amphotericin B is treating a wide range of systemic fungal infections. Due to its extensive side effects, it is often reserved for severe infections in critically ill or immunocompromised patients. It is considered first line therapy for invasive mucormycosis infections, cryptococcal meningitis, and certain aspergillus and candidal infections. It has been a highly effective drug for over fifty years in large part because it has a low incidence of drug resistance in the pathogens it treats. This is because amphotericin B resistance requires sacrifices on the part of the pathogen that make it susceptible to the host environment, and too weak to cause infection.

=== Antiprotozoal ===
Amphotericin B is used for life-threatening protozoan infections such as visceral leishmaniasis and primary amoebic meningoencephalitis.

=== Spectrum of susceptibility ===
The following table shows the amphotericin B susceptibility for several medically important fungi.

Species	MIC breakpoint (mg/L)
Aspergillus fumigatus	1
Aspergillus terreus	Resistant
Candida albicans	1
Candida glabrata	1
Candida krusei	1
Candida lusitaniae	Intrinsically resistant
Cryptococcus neoformans	2
Fusarium oxysporum	2

== Available formulations ==
=== Intravenous ===
Amphotericin B alone is insoluble in normal saline at a pH of 7. Therefore, several formulations have been devised to improve its intravenous bioavailability. Lipid-based formulations of amphotericin B are no more effective than conventional formulations, although some evidence suggests lipid-based formulations may be better tolerated and have fewer adverse effects.

==== Deoxycholate ====
The original formulation uses sodium deoxycholate to improve solubility. Amphotericin B deoxycholate (ABD) is administered intravenously. As the original formulation of amphotericin, it is often referred to as "conventional" amphotericin.

==== Liposomal ====
To improve the tolerability of amphotericin and reduce toxicity, researchers developed several lipid formulations. Liposomal formulations have been found to have less renal toxicity than deoxycholate, and fewer infusion-related reactions. They are more expensive than amphotericin B deoxycholate.

AmBisome (liposomal amphotericin B; LAMB) is a liposomal formulation of amphotericin B for injection and consists of a mixture of phosphatidylcholine, cholesterol and distearoyl phosphatidylglycerol that in aqueous media spontaneously arrange into unilamellar vesicles that contain amphotericin B. It was developed by NeXstar Pharmaceuticals (acquired by Gilead Sciences in 1999). It was approved by the United States Food and Drug Administration (FDA) in 1997. It is marketed by Gilead in Europe and licensed to Astellas Pharma (formerly Fujisawa Pharmaceuticals) for marketing in the US, and Sumitomo Pharmaceuticals in Japan.

==== Lipid complex formulations ====
Several lipid complex preparations are also available. Abelcet was approved by the FDA in 1995. It consists of amphotericin B and two lipids in a 1:1 ratio that form large ribbon-like structures. Amphotec is a complex of amphotericin and sodium cholesteryl sulfate in a 1:1 ratio. Two molecules of each form a tetramer that aggregates into spiral arms on a disk-like complex. It was approved by the FDA in 1996.

=== By mouth ===
An oral preparation exists but is not widely available. The amphipathic nature of amphotericin along with its low solubility and permeability has posed major hurdles for oral administration given its low bioavailability. In the past it had been used for fungal infections of the surface of the GI tract such as thrush, but has been replaced by other antifungals such as nystatin and fluconazole.

However, recently novel nanoparticulate drug delivery systems such as AmbiOnp, nanosuspensions, lipid-based drug delivery systems including cochleates, self-emulsifying drug delivery systems, solid lipid nanoparticles and polymeric nanoparticles—such as amphotericin B in pegylated polylactide coglycolide copolymer nanoparticles—have demonstrated potential for oral formulation of amphotericin B. The oral lipid nanocrystal amphotericin by Matinas Biopharma is furthest along, having completed a successful phase 2 clinical trial in cryptococcal meningitis.

== Side effects ==
Amphotericin B is well known for its severe and potentially lethal side effects, earning it the nickname "amphoterrible". Very often, it causes a serious reaction soon after infusion (within 1 to 3 hours), consisting of high fever, shaking chills, hypotension, anorexia, nausea, vomiting, headache, dyspnea and tachypnea, drowsiness, and generalized weakness. The violent chills and fevers have caused the drug to be nicknamed "shake and bake". The precise etiology of the reaction is unclear, although it may involve increased prostaglandin synthesis and the release of cytokines from macrophages. Deoxycholate formulations (ABD) may also stimulate the release of histamine from mast cells and basophils. Reactions sometimes subside with later applications of the drug. This nearly universal febrile response necessitates a critical (and diagnostically difficult) professional determination as to whether the onset of high fever is a novel symptom of a fast-progressing disease or merely the effect of the drug. To decrease the likelihood and severity of the symptoms, initial doses should be low and increased slowly. Paracetamol, pethidine, diphenhydramine, and hydrocortisone have all been used to treat or prevent the syndrome, but the prophylactic use of these drugs is often limited by the patient's condition.

Intravenously administered amphotericin B in therapeutic doses has also been associated with multiple organ damage. Kidney damage, including Type I (distal) renal tubular acidosis, is a frequently reported side effect, and can be severe and/or irreversible. Less kidney toxicity has been reported with liposomal formulations (such as AmBisome) and it has become preferred in patients with preexisting renal injury. The integrity of the liposome is disrupted when it binds to the fungal cell wall, but is not affected by the mammalian cell membrane, so the association with liposomes decreases the exposure of the kidneys to amphotericin B, which explains its less nephrotoxic effects.

In addition, electrolyte imbalances such as hypokalemia and hypomagnesemia are also common. In the liver, increased liver enzymes and hepatotoxicity (up to and including fulminant liver failure) are common. In the circulatory system, several forms of anemia and other blood dyscrasias (leukopenia, thrombopenia), serious cardiac arrhythmias (including ventricular fibrillation), and even frank cardiac failure have been reported. Skin reactions are also possible, with rash & itching occurring in about 17% of patients, in rare cases it can cause a serious skin reaction known as Drug rash with eosinophilia and systemic symptoms (DRESS).

In very rare instances, amphotericin B has also been shown to cause reversible ototoxicity causing tinnitus, vertigo, and temporary hearing loss. While there have been only a few reported cases, the hearing loss was temporary in all of them, with hearing showing improvement two weeks after discontinuing the drug.

The analogue AM-2-19 has been engineered to be less toxic to the kidneys.

== Interactions ==
Drug-drug interactions may occur when amphotericin B is coadministered with the following agents:

- Flucytosine: The toxicity of flucytosine is increased and allows for a lower dose of amphotericin B. Amphotericin B may also facilitate entry of flucytosine into the fungal cell by interfering with the permeability of the fungal cell membrane.
- Diuretics or cisplatin: Increased renal toxicity and increased risk of hypokalemia
- Corticosteroids: Increased risk of hypokalemia
- Imidazole antifungals: Amphotericin B may antagonize the activity of ketoconazole and miconazole. The clinical significance of this interaction is unknown.
- Neuromuscular-blocking agents: Amphotericin B–induced hypokalemia may potentiate the effects of certain paralytic agents.
- Foscarnet, ganciclovir, tenofovir, adefovir: The risk of hematological and kidney side effects of amphotericin B is increased
- Zidovudine: Increased the risk of kidney and hematological toxicity.
- Other nephrotoxic drugs (such as aminoglycosides): Increased risk of serious renal damage
- Cytostatic drugs: Increased risk of kidney damage, low blood pressure, and airway spasms
- Transfusion of leukocytes: There is a risk that pulmonary (lung) damage may occur. Space the intervals between the application of amphotericin B and the transfusion, and monitor pulmonary function

== Mechanism of action ==
Amphotericin B binds with ergosterol, a component of fungal cell membranes, forming pores that cause rapid leakage of monovalent ions (K^{+}, Na^{+}, H^{+} and Cl^{−}) and subsequent fungal cell death. This is amphotericin B's primary effect as an antifungal agent. It has been found that the amphotericin B/ergosterol bimolecular complex that maintains these pores is stabilized by Van der Waals interactions. Researchers have found evidence that amphotericin B also causes oxidative stress within the fungal cell, but it remains unclear to what extent this oxidative damage contributes to the drug's effectiveness. The addition of free radical scavengers or antioxidants can lead to amphotericin resistance in some species, such as Scedosporium prolificans, without affecting the cell wall.

Two amphotericins, amphotericin A and amphotericin B, are known, but only B is used clinically, because it is significantly more active in vivo. Amphotericin A is almost identical to amphotericin B (having a C=C double bond between the 27th and 28th carbons), but has little antifungal activity.

== Mechanism of toxicity ==
Mammalian and fungal membranes contain sterols, a primary membrane target for amphotericin B. Because mammalian and fungal membranes are similar in structure and composition, this is one mechanism by which amphotericin B causes cellular toxicity. Amphotericin B molecules can form pores in the host membrane as well as the fungal membrane. This impairment in membrane barrier function can have lethal effects. Ergosterol, the fungal sterol, is more sensitive to amphotericin B than cholesterol, the common mammalian sterol. Reactivity with the membrane is also sterol concentration dependent. Bacteria are not affected as their cell membranes do not usually contain sterols.

Amphotericin B administration is limited by infusion-related toxicity. This is thought to result from innate immune production of proinflammatory cytokines.

== Biosynthesis ==
The natural route to synthesis includes polyketide synthase (PKS) components. The carbon chains of amphotericin B are assembled from sixteen 'C2' acetate and three 'C3' propionate units by polyketide syntheses. Polyketide biosynthesis begins with the decarboxylative condensation of a dicarboxylic acid extender unit with a starter acyl unit to form a β-ketoacyl intermediate. A series of Claisen reactions constructs the growing chain. The extender units are loaded onto the current ACP domain by acetyl transferase (AT) within each module. The ACP-bound elongation group reacts in a Claisen condensation with the KS-bound polyketide chain. Ketoreductase (KR), dehydratase (DH), and enoyl reductase (ER) enzymes may also be present to form alcohol, double bonds, or single bonds. After cyclisation, the macrolactone core undergoes further modification by hydroxylation, methylation and glycosylation. The order of these three post-cyclization processes is unknown.

== History ==
It was originally extracted from Streptomyces nodosus, a filamentous bacterium, in 1955, at the Squibb Institute for Medical Research from cultures of an undescribed streptomycete isolated from the soil collected in the Orinoco River region of Venezuela. Two antifungal substances were isolated from the soil culture, amphotericin A and amphotericin B, but B had better antifungal activity. For decades, it remained the only effective therapy for invasive fungal disease until the development of the azole antifungals in the early 1980s.

Its complete stereo structure was determined in 1970 by an X-ray structure of the N-iodoacetyl derivative. The first synthesis of the compound's naturally occurring enantiomeric form was achieved in 1987 by K. C. Nicolaou.

Amphotericin B was used to treat a patient with disseminated coccidioidomycosis who was admitted to the U.S. Public Health Service Hospital, Seattle, Washington, on January 16, 1957. "The course was rapidly downhill with a grim prognosis as manifested by positive blood cultures, rising complement fixation titers, and failure of the skin to react to intradermal coccidioidin. Amphotericin B was started eight weeks following the onset of his illness. Following this, there was a remarkable improvement both objectively and subjectively. A fourteen-month follow-up after drug discontinuation revealed stabilization of all laboratory studies except for a re-elevation of the complement fixation titer from 1 to 16 to 1 to 32. The patient was completely asymptomatic except for the sputum production containing a few spherules. The clinical effect of this drug in this patient has been most encouraging and agrees with results obtained by others. The lasting effect of the drug seems suggested by the patient's complete well-being after fourteen months of cessation of treatment. It is reasonable to assume that this drug will play a major part in the specific treatment of this disease."

=== Formulations ===
It is a subgroup of the macrolide antibiotics and exhibits similar structural elements. Currently, the drug is available in many forms. Either "conventionally" complexed with sodium deoxycholate (ABD), as a cholesteryl sulfate complex (ABCD), as a lipid complex (ABLC), and as a liposomal formulation (LAMB). The latter formulations have been developed to improve tolerability and decrease toxicity, but may show considerably different pharmacokinetic characteristics compared to conventional amphotericin B.

=== Names ===
Amphotericin's name originates from the chemical's amphoteric properties.

It is commercially known as Fungilin, Fungizone, Abelcet, AmBisome, Fungisome, Amphocil, Amphotec, and Halizon.
