= Cryptococcus depauperatus =

Scientific classification
- Kingdom: Fungi
- Division: Basidiomycota
- Class: Tremellomycetes
- Order: Tremellales
- Family: Cryptococcaceae
- Genus: Cryptococcus
- Species: C. depauperatus

Binomial name
- Cryptococcus depauperatus (Petch) Boekhout, Xin Z. Liu, F.Y. Bai & M. Groenew. 2015

Species of fungi

Cryptococcus depauperatus is a species of fungi in the family Cryptococcaceae. It is notable for its apparent reliance on sexual reproduction and the absence of a known asexual yeast stage under laboratory conditions. Unlike the human pathogenic species Cryptococcus neoformans and Cryptococcus gattii, C. depauperatus has not been associated with human disease and is primarily of interest as a model for studying fungal sexual reproduction and mating system evolution.

== Description ==
Colonies of Cryptococcus depauperatus are white to cream-colored and consist primarily of filamentous hyphae rather than budding yeast cells. The species lacks a known yeast growth phase and instead produces sexual structures during vegetative growth.

Microscopically, the fungus forms slender hyphae containing basidia with swollen apical heads. The spores are hyaline, smooth-walled, and typically ellipsoid to obovoid in shape.

== Reproduction ==
Most fungi are heterothallic, meaning they require the interaction between two compatible partners with distinct mating types to undergo sexual reproduction. Cryptococcus depauperatus is homothallic and is capable of completing sexual reproduction without a compatible mating partner. Colonies readily produce hyphae, basidia, and basidiospores under standard laboratory conditions. The genome of C. depauperatus contains a compatible pheromone and pheromone receptor within the same haploid genome but lacks detectable homologs of canonical homeodomain mating-type genes that are conserved in other basidiomycetes. This mating system is thought to permit self-compatible activation of the mating pathway through autocrine pheromone signaling, allowing a single individual to initiate sexual development.

== Genetics ==
Unlike most other species of Cryptococcus which have 14 or more chromosomes, C. depauperatus only has eight chromosomes. In other fungal species, such as members of the genus Kwoniella, chromosomal loss has been well documented as resulting from chromosome fusions which leads to the formation of giant chromosomes. However, the reduction of chromosomes in C. depauperatus appears to be due to an alternative mechanism, such as intercentromeric recombination followed by loss of repeat rich centromeres.
