= Joseph Heitman =

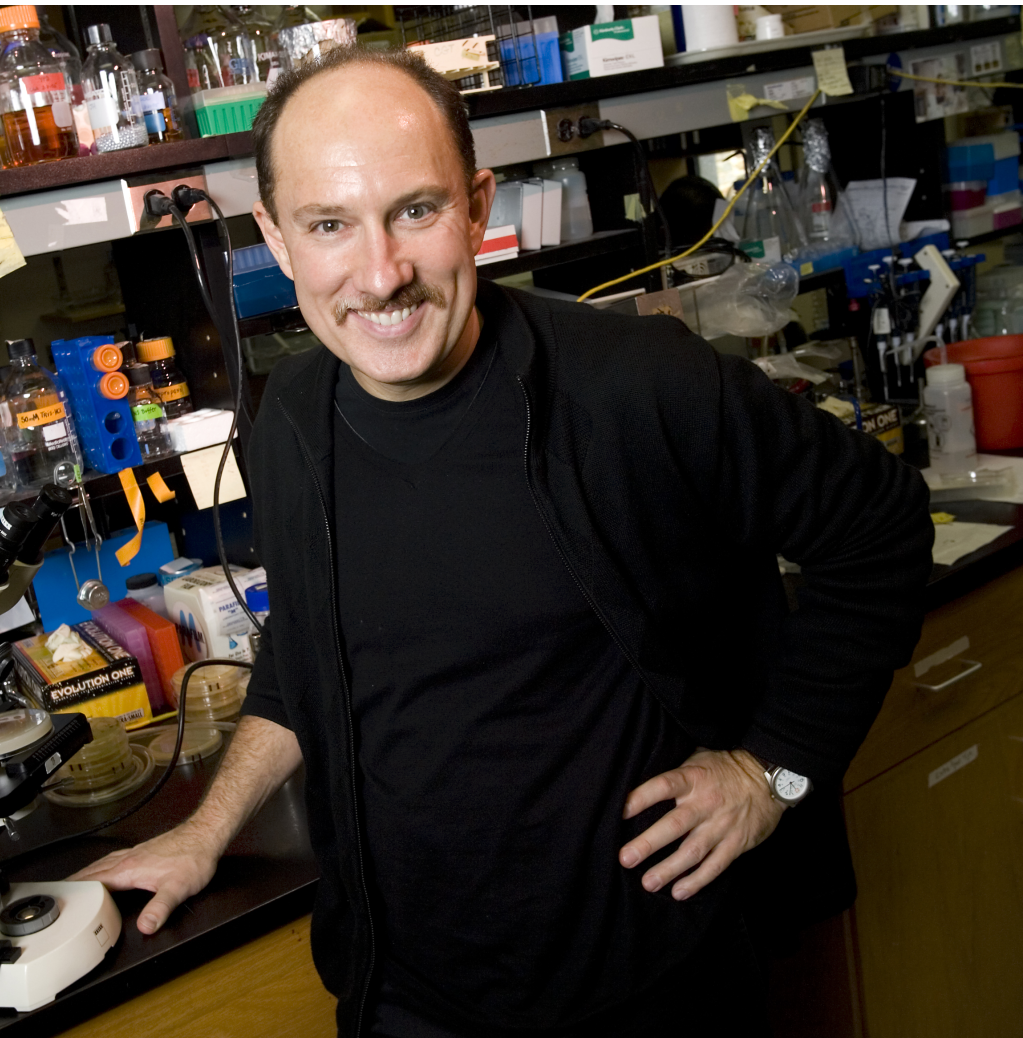
- Occupations: geneticist, microbiologist, and molecular biologist
- Awards: Edward Novitski Prize (2019)

Academic background
- Education: University of Chicago, Cornell and Rockefeller Universities
- Doctoral advisor: Peter Model, Norton Zinder
- Other advisor: Michael N. Hall

Academic work
- Discipline: Microbiology, Genetics, Infectious Diseases
- Sub-discipline: Mycology, Genomics, Evolution, Molecular Biology
- Institutions: Duke University School of Medicine
- Notable students: Christina M. Hull (postdoc 2000-2003)

Joseph Heitman is an American physician-scientist focused on research in genetics, microbiology, and infectious diseases. He is the James B. Duke Professor and Chair of the Department of Molecular Genetics and Microbiology at Duke University School of Medicine.

== Education and career ==
Joseph Heitman grew up in southwestern Michigan and attended Portage Northern High School. He completed a dual Bachelor of Science–Master of Science program in chemistry and biochemistry at the University of Chicago from 1980 to 1984. There he began his research career, working in the laboratories of organic chemist Josef Fried, biochemist Kan Agarwal, and bacteriologist Malcolm Casadaban. In 1984, he began a dual MD–PhD program at Cornell Medical College and Rockefeller University, working on DNA repair in bacteria with Peter Model and Norton Zinder. In 1989, after receiving his PhD from Rockefeller University, Heitman took a leave of absence from medical school to serve as an EMBO-sponsored long-term fellow at the Biozentrum University of Basel working with Michael N. Hall and Rao Movva applying yeast genetics to understand the mechanisms of action of immunosuppressive drugs. This work led to the discovery of the cellular growth regulator TOR for which Michael Hall was awarded the Albert Lasker Award for Basic Medical Research in 2017. In 1992, Heitman finished medical school and moved to Duke University to set up his own laboratory in the Department of Molecular Genetics and Microbiology. He was an investigator with the Howard Hughes Medical Institute from 1992 to 2005 and a Burroughs Wellcome Scholar in Molecular Pathogenic Mycology from 1998 to 2005. He became Chair of the Department of Molecular Genetics and Microbiology in 2009. Since 2019, Heitman has been co-director of the Canadian Institute for Advanced Research's Fungal Kingdom program along with co-director Leah E. Cowen.

Heitman's research has been recognized with prestigious awards and funding opportunities, including funding by the Howard Hughes Medical Institute from 1992 to 2005, and an National Institutes of Health MERIT Award from 2011-2021. Several awards have recognized his research accomplishments, including the ASBMB AMGEN Award (2002), the IDSA Squibb Award (2003) (now called the Oswald Avery Award), the Stanley J. Korsmeyer Award (2018) (for key contributions to understanding how microbial pathogens evolve, cause disease, and develop drug resistance and discovery of TOR and FKBP12 as targets of rapamycin), the Rhoda Benham Award (2018), the Edward Novitski Prize (2019) (honoring work on human fungal pathogens and identifying molecular targets of widely used immunosuppressive drugs, a seminal contribution to discovery of TOR, which regulates cell growth in response to nutrients), the American Society for Microbiology's Award for Basic Research (2019), and the Distinguished Mycologist Award from the Mycological Society of America (2021). Heitman is an elected fellow or member of the Infectious Diseases Society of America (2003), American Society for Clinical Investigation (2003), American Academy of Microbiology (2004), American Association for the Advancement of Science (2004), the Association of American Physicians (2006), the American Academy of Arts and Sciences (2020), the National Academy of Sciences (2021), the German National Academy of Sciences Leopoldina (2021), and the National Academy of Medicine (2024).

== Research ==
Heitman's research has largely focused on studies of model and pathogenic fungi to address unsolved problems in biology and medicine. Pioneering research with the model budding yeast Saccharomyces cerevisiae discovered TOR and FKBP12 as the targets of the immunosuppressive and antiproliferative drug rapamycin, now widely used in organ transplantation and cancer chemotherapy. Later studies elucidated key features of how the TOR signaling pathway senses nutrients to control cellular responses. Studies were conducted on the dimorphic transition of Saccharomyces cerevisiae from budding yeast cells to pseudohyphae, elucidating nutrient sensing signaling cascades governing this morphological transition involving GPCR-cAMP-PKA signaling cascades controlling gene expression, and discovering a novel role for the ammonium permease/Rh antigen homolog Mep2 as a transceptor for nitrogen source availability.

Heitman's research program has also focused extensive studies on the pathogenesis, sexual cycle, and novel drug targets of the pathogenic fungus Cryptococcus. His group described a previously unknown form of sexual reproduction in Cryptococcus species, known as unisexual reproduction, which involves both selfing sexual reproduction (homothallism) of isolates grown on their own without a mating partner, as well as sexual reproduction and recombination involving cell-cell fusion between individuals of the same mating type followed by meiosis and sporulation. Studies conducted in parallel defined and illuminated evolution and function of fungal mating-type loci, illustrating parallels with sex chromosome evolution of plants and animals, including the discovery and characterization of the homeodomain proteins Sxi1alpha and Sxi2a, which coordinately control cell type identity and sexual reproduction. Heitman's group has also had a long-standing interest in fungal evolution, describing how cellular processes such as sexual recombination and RNA interference are changed in different fungal lineages, as well as the expansion of the geographic range of the emerging pathogen Cryptococcus gattii.

== Roles as editor and in scientific publishing ==
Joseph Heitman has served as co-editor of seven textbooks spanning microbiology, genetics, infectious diseases: The Fungal Kingdom, ASM Press October 2017, editors: Joseph Heitman, Barbara J. Howlett, Pedro W. Crous, Eva H. Stukenbrock, Timothy Yong James, and Neil A.R. Gow.; Sex in Fungi: Molecular Determination and Evolutionary Implications, ASM Press 2007, editors: Joseph Heitman, James W. Kronstad, John W. Taylor, and Lorna A. Casselton.; Cryptococcus: From Human Pathogen to Model Yeast, ASM Press 2011, editors: Joseph Heitman, Thomas R. Kozel, Kyung J. Kwon-Chung, John R. Perfect, and Arturo Casadevall.; Molecular Principles of Fungal Pathogenesis, ASM Press 2006, editors: Joseph Heitman, Scott G. Filler, John E. Edwards Jr., and Aaron P. Mitchell.; Human Fungal Pathogens, Cold Spring Harbor Laboratory Press, 2015, editors: Arturo Casadevall, Aaron P. Mitchell, Judith Berman, Kyung J. Kwon-Chung, John R. Perfect, and Joseph Heitman.; Evolution of Virulence in Eukaryotic Microbes, Wiley Press June 2012, editors: L. David Sibley, Barbara J. Howlett, and Joseph Heitman.; and Yeast as a Tool in Cancer Research, Springer Press, 2007, editors: John L. Nitiss and Joseph Heitman.

Joseph Heitman serves as an editor for journals including PLOS Pathogens, PLOS Genetics, mBio, Fungal Genetics & Biology, and Frontiers Cellular and Infection Microbiology | Fungal Pathogenesis, and from 2006 to present on the editorial boards for the journals Current Biology, Cell Host & Microbe, and PLOS Biology.
