= Cryptococcus ater =

Scientific classification
- Domain: Eukaryota
- Kingdom: Fungi
- Division: Basidiomycota
- Class: Tremellomycetes
- Order: Tremellales
- Family: Cryptococcaceae
- Genus: Cryptococcus
- Species: C. ater

Binomial name
- Cryptococcus ater (Castell. ex W.B. Cooke) Phaff & Fell

Species of fungus

Cryptococcus ater is a species of Cryptococcus that has some unique characteristics. When grown on agar it typically produces cream colonies, however when grown on neopeptone agar slants, the colonies turn olive green after approximately four weeks. This species also turns nearly black when grown on Diamalt agar slants and on Gorodkova agar after approximately three months. When grown in liquid media it develops sediment and a weak ring. On the microscopic level the cells appear globose to ovate and are capsulated. Occasionally the cells have been seen to create chains of four to five cells. When grown, it does not require vitamins, but its growth is weakened by the presence of ammonium sulfate. It is able to assimilate alpha-methyl-D-glucoside, Ca-2-keto-gluconate, cellobiose, D-arabinose, D-mannitol, D-sorbitol, D-xylose, galactose, glucose, K-5-keto-gluconate- K-gluconate, lactose, L-arabinose, L-rhamnose, maltose, melezitose, i-inositol, raffinose, salicin and trehalose. This species has been isolated from ulcers in a leg.
