= Immune reconstitution inflammatory syndrome =

- Specialty: Immunology

Immune reconstitution inflammatory syndrome (IRIS) is a condition seen in some cases of HIV/AIDS or immunosuppression, in which the immune system begins to recover, but then responds to a previously acquired opportunistic infection with an overwhelming inflammatory response that paradoxically makes the symptoms of infection worse.

IRIS may also be referred to as immune reconstitution syndrome, immune reconstitution disease, immune recovery disease, and immune restoration disease.

Systemic or local inflammatory responses may occur with improvement in immune function. While this inflammatory reaction is usually self-limited, there is risk of long-term symptoms and death, particularly when the central nervous system is involved.

Management generally involves symptom control and treatment of the underlying infection. In severe cases of IRIS, corticosteroids are commonly used. Important exceptions to using corticosteroids include cryptococcal meningitis and Kaposi's sarcoma, as they have been associated with poorer outcomes.

== Mechanism ==
There are two common IRIS scenarios. The first is the "unmasking" of an occult opportunistic infection. The second is the "paradoxical" symptomatic relapse of a prior infection despite microbiologic treatment success. Often in paradoxical IRIS, microbiologic cultures are sterile. In either scenario, there is hypothesized reconstitution of antigen-specific T cell-mediated immunity with activation of the immune system against persisting antigen, whether present as intact organisms, dead organisms, or debris.

== In HIV infection and immunosuppression ==
The suppression of CD4 T cells by HIV (or by immunosuppressive drugs) causes a decrease in the body's normal response to certain infections. Not only does this make it more difficult to fight the infection, it may mean that a level of infection that would normally produce symptoms is instead undetected (subclinical infection). If the CD4 count rapidly increases (due to effective treatment of HIV, or removal of other causes of immunosuppression), a sudden increase in the inflammatory response produces nonspecific symptoms such as fever, and in some cases a worsening of damage to the infected tissue.

Though these symptoms can be dangerous, they also indicate that the body may now have a better chance to defeat the infection. The best treatment for this condition is unknown. In paradoxical IRIS reactions, the events will usually spontaneously get better with time without any additional therapy. In unmasking IRIS, the most common treatment is to administer antibiotic or antiviral drugs against the infectious organism. In some severe cases, anti-inflammatory medications, such as corticosteroids are needed to suppress inflammation until the infection has been eliminated.

Infections most commonly associated with IRIS include Mycobacterium tuberculosis and cryptococcal meningitis. Persons living with AIDS are more at risk for IRIS if they are starting HAART for the first time, or if they have recently been treated for an opportunistic infection (OI). It is generally advised that when patients have a low initial CD4 T cell count and OI at the time of their HIV diagnosis, they receive treatment to control the OIs before HAART is initiated approximately two weeks later. This is true for most OIs, except for OIs involving the central nervous system.

== In individuals without HIV/AIDS ==
Since the HIV/AIDS epidemic in the 1980s, IRIS is now mostly associated with the initiation of HIV treatment with highly active antiretroviral therapy (HAART), also referred to as antiretroviral therapy (ART). However, IRIS can still occur in the following conditions that do not involve HIV:

- Solid organ transplant recipients
  - After undergoing solid organ transplant (liver, kidney, pancreas, etc.), patients are prescribed immunosuppressive agents, such as tacrolimus or cyclosporine. These medications target CD4 immune cells, suppressing their function. IRIS in these patients is thought to be due to the pro-inflammatory response after withdrawal of immunosuppressants. Common infections associated with IRIS in these patients are cryptococcosis, cytomegalovirus (CMV), and tuberculosis.
- Neutropenic patients
  - When the absolute neutrophil count (ANC) is less than 500 per microliter, there is an increased risk of fungal and viral opportunistic infections (OI), such as Aspergillus or CMV. While the patient is immunosuppressed, these infections may remain latent and asymptomatic. However, when the ANC improves, the infections may become symptomatic and present as IRIS. Common infections associated with IRIS in these patients are invasive pulmonary aspergillosis and chronic disseminated candidiasis.
- Postpartum patients
  - During pregnancy, the immune system is relatively suppressed to prevent fetal rejections or miscarriages. In the immediate postpartum period (3 to 6 weeks), this process is reversed, resulting in a relative pro-inflammatory state. There is an increased risk of IRIS during this period. Common infections associated with IRIS in these patients include cryptococcosis, human papillomavirus reactivation, herpes virus, tuberculosis, leprosy, viral hepatitis. Flare-ups of autoimmune conditions such as systemic lupus erythematosus and rheumatoid arthritis may also occur during this period.
- Patients on tumor necrosis factor antagonists
  - Patients with chronic inflammatory conditions (Crohn's disease, ulcerative colitis, sarcoidosis, etc.) are often treated with TNF antagonists, such as infliximab, adalimumab, and etanercept. Tumor necrosis factors are critical in macrophage activation and subsequent granuloma formation. Therefore, TNF antagonists impair the host immune response against infections such as tuberculosis. While the patient is taking TNF antagonists, these infections may remain latent and asymptomatic. However, when these medications are discontinued, there may be an associated pro-inflammatory response causing the infection to be uncovered.

== In cryptococcal meningitis ==
IRIS is particularly problematic in cryptococcal meningitis as IRIS is fairly common and can be fatal.

IRIS has been described in immunocompetent hosts who have meningitis caused by Cryptococcus gattii and Cryptococcus neoformans var. grubii, environmental fungi which often affect immunocompetent hosts. Several weeks or even months into appropriate treatment, there is a sudden onset deterioration with worsening meningitis symptoms and progression or development of new neurological symptoms.

Magnetic resonance imaging shows increase in the size of brain lesions, and CSF abnormalities (white cell count, protein, glucose) increase. CSF culture is typically sterile, and there is no increase in CSF cryptococcal antigen titer.

The increasing inflammation can cause brain injury or be fatal.

The general mechanism behind IRIS is increased inflammation as the recovering immune system recognizes the antigens of the fungus as immunosuppression is reversed. Cryptococcal IRIS has three phases:

1. before HAART, with a paucity of cerebrospinal fluid (CSF) inflammation and defects in antigen clearance;
2. during initial HAART immune recovery, with pro-inflammatory signaling by antigen-presenting cells without an effector response; and
3. at IRIS, a cytokine storm with a predominant type-1 helper T-cell interferon-gamma response.

Three clinical predictors of cryptococcal-related paradoxical IRIS risk include:

1. lack of initial CSF pleocytosis (i.e. low CSF white blood cell count);
2. elevated C-reactive protein;
3. failure to sterilize the CSF before immune recovery.

IRIS may be the cause of paradoxically worse outcomes for cryptococcal meningitis in immunocompetent compared with immunocompromised hosts, in whom Cryptococcus neoformans is the usual pathogen. Treatment with systemic corticosteroids during IRIS may be beneficial in preventing death or progressive neurological deterioration. Steroids given to persons with anti-fungal treatment failure / cryptococcal relapse (in whom CSF cultures are not sterile) can be a fatal iatrogenic error.

== Signs and symptoms ==
The clinical presentation of IRIS is variable and typically depends on the underlying OI. Common features that may be present include clinical worsening after starting ART and localized tissue inflammation. A systemic inflammatory response may or may not be present. The majority of IRIS cases occur within 4 to 8 weeks of ART initiation or change. However, there have been reported cases from 3 days to several months or even years after ART initiation.

The following table describes the major and minor presentations in reported underlying OIs.

Underlying opportunistic infection	IRIS signs/symptoms
Major presentations
Tuberculosis	Worsening of pulmonary symptoms; Worsening TB disease on X-ray; Enlarging lymph nodes which may cause airway obstruction; Meningeal symptoms (headache, neck stiffness)
Mycobacterium Avium complex (MAC) infection	May be indistinguishable from active MAC infection (pulmonary disease, systemic inflammation)
Cryptococcal meningitis	Typically worsening meningitis symptoms (rapid hearing/vision loss, ataxia, elevated intracranial pressure)
Cytomegalovirus (CMV) retinitis	Retinitis, vitritis, or uveitis; Retinitis usually occurs at the site of previous CMV retinitis lesions; Presence of vitritis or uveitis may help distinguish IRIS from active CMV retinitis; May cause rapid and permanent vision loss
Hepatitis B or Hepatitis C virus	May be difficult to distinguish from drug-induced hepatitis; Flares are typically mild and self-limited, presenting with transient transaminase elevations. May cause decompensated cirrhosis in the setting of underlying liver disease.
Progressive multifocal leukoencephalopathy (PML)	May present as new or worsening focal neurologic deficits; New or worsened PML lesions on MRI
Kaposi's sarcoma (KS)	Worsening of KS, most commonly cutaneous lesions; May also present with lymphedema and oral, gastric, lung, genital, or conjunctival lesions; Cases of fatal KS-IRIS have been reported
Cerebral toxoplasmosis	Cerebral abscess (aka toxoplasmosis encephalitis)
Autoimmune diseases	Flares of existing autoimmune conditions, including sarcoidosis or Grave's disease
Minor presentations
Herpes simplex virus (HSV) and Varicella zoster virus (VZV)	Reactivation of HSV and VZV, even if not previously diagnosed; Usually presents similarly to non-IRIS disease, but may have relatively worse symptoms
Nonspecific dermatologic complications	Appearance or worsening of a variety of dermatologic manifestations, including folliculitis, oral and genital warts

== Diagnosis ==
The diagnosis of IRIS is clinical. There is no universal definition of IRIS, however there is general consensus that most of the following criteria should be met to make the diagnosis:

- Presence of AIDS with low pretreatment CD4 count, typically <100 cells/microL. An exception is in the setting of Mycobacterium tuberculosis infection, which can be reactivated with CD4 cells >200 cells/microL.
- Decrease in HIV-1 RNA levels from baseline or increase in CD4 count after starting ART
- No evidence of drug-resistant infection, bacterial superinfection, adverse drug reaction, patient non-adherence, or reduced serum drug levels (from drug-drug interactions or malabsorption).
- Clinical symptoms consistent with an inflammatory condition
- Temporal association between initiation of ART and symptom onset

The differential diagnosis of IRIS is broad given its varied presentation. Conditions that can present similarly to IRIS are: adverse drug effects, progression of initial OI caused by medication resistance or patient non-adherence, and development of a new OI.

== Management ==
Mild IRIS

- For mild symptoms, treatment is focused on treating the underlying infection and symptom management. Non-steroidal anti-inflammatory drugs (NSAIDs) may be used to alleviate inflammatory symptoms, such as fever or pain. Abscess drainage, excision of painful and inflamed lymph nodes, and inhaled corticosteroids for bronchospasm from mild pulmonary inflammation may also be used when indicated.

Severe IRIS

- In severe IRIS, symptoms may cause permanent disability or death. Management again includes antimicrobial treatments against the underlying infection. Corticosteroids are the most commonly used intervention in these cases as they work to suppress the inflammatory response seen in IRIS, though there is limited research on their efficacy. Guidelines recommend a risk/benefit analysis prior to starting corticosteroids, especially taking into consideration the patient's comorbidities. Common adverse effects of corticosteroids are hyperglycemia, hypertension, mental status changes, worsening of an existing infection, and increased risk of a new infection. Important exceptions include cases of Cryptococcal-IRIS with worsening meningitis symptoms (cranial nerve defects, hearing or vision changes) and cases of Kaposi's sarcoma. In these cases, corticosteroids should not be used as they have been shown to worsen outcomes.
- It is recommended to continue ART except in the most severe cases of IRIS. Discontinuing ART may be considered in life-threatening cases of IRIS not improved by corticosteroids, usually in central nervous system-associated IRIS. Stopping ART increases the risk of acquiring new OI and developing IRIS again when restarting ART.

== Prognosis ==
IRIS has a reported mortality rate of 4.5%. Mortality rates vary and depend on the associated OI, degree of immunosuppression, geography, and access to treatment. IRIS affecting the central nervous system has generally been associated with the highest mortality rates (13-75%).

== History ==
IRIS was discovered in the 1980s when physicians noted paradoxical symptomatic worsening of patients being treated for pulmonary tuberculosis and leprosy. There was worsened fever, weight loss, shortness of breath, and fatigue in patients with pulmonary tuberculosis and worsened skin lesions in patients with leprosy. Though the mechanism was unclear at the time, these observations were attributed to a pro-inflammatory state brought on by starting treatment.

=== In bats recovering from white-nose syndrome ===
Bats recovering from white-nose syndrome (WNS) may be the first known natural occurrence of IRIS, in a report released by the USGS. WNS is typified by a cutaneous infection of the fungus Pseudogymnoascus destructans during hibernation, when the immune system is naturally suppressed to conserve energy through the winter. This study suggests that bats undergoing an intense inflammation at the site of infection after a return to euthermia is a form of IRIS.

== See also ==
- List of cutaneous conditions
- Jarisch–Herxheimer reaction, another systemic inflammatory syndrome that arises after antimicrobial treatment
