= Christina M. Hull =

American mycologist

Christina M. Hull (born 1970) is an American mycologist and Professor in the Department of Biomolecular Chemistry at the University of Wisconsin School of Medicine and Public Health.

== Education and career ==
Christina Hull completed her B.S. degree from the University of Utah in 1992. She then went on to complete a Ph.D. with Alexander D. Johnson at the University of California, San Francisco in 2000. Her thesis was titled "Identification and characterization of a mating type-like locus in the "asexual" pathogenic yeast Candida albicans". She then went on to complete a postdoctoral fellowship with Joseph Heitman at Duke University from 2000 to 2003. She is now a professor at the Department of Biomolecular Chemistry at the University of Wisconsin School of Medicine and Public Health.

Throughout the years, Hull has been awarded for her work many times. Among these are American Society for Cell Biology-Merton Bernfield Memorial Award and the UW SMPH Women in Medicine and Science Excellence in Mentorship Award.

== Research ==
Hull's research focuses on fungal development, with a particular focus on how fungi enter and leave the spore form. Her group primarily does this work using the pathogenic fungus Cryptococcus. Hull was always interested in exploring the fundamental properties of life on earth and emerging them with different technologies. She hopes to shed light upon the prevention of spores entering the lungs, especially for children's pediatrics, and to develop drugs that prevent fungi from getting a foothold in the first place by inhibiting spore germination.

== Notable publications ==
- Giles SS, Dagenais TRT... Hull CM (2009). Elucidating the pathogenesis of spores from the human fungal pathogen Crytococcus neoformans. Infection and Immunity. 77(8): pgs. 3491-3500
- Hull CM, Raisner RM, Johnson AD (2000). Evidence for mating of the 'asexual' yeast Candida albicans in a mammalian host. Science. 289(5477): pgs. 307-310
- Hull CM, Johnson AD (1999). Identification of a mating type-like locus in the asexual pathogenic yeast Candida albicans. Science. 285(5431): pgs. 1271-1275
