= Alexander D. Johnson =

American biochemist

Alexander "Sandy" D. Johnson is an American biochemist and Professor and Vice Chair of the Department of Microbiology and Immunology at the University of California, San Francisco. He is a member of the U.S. National Academy of Sciences.

== Early life and education ==
Alexander D. Johnson was born in Oak Ridge, Tennessee in 1952. In 1970, Johnson enrolled as an undergraduate at Vanderbilt University. He originally studied physics and mathematics; however, a summer as a technician in the laboratory of Howard E. Morgan convinced him to switch his area of study to molecular biology. He completed his B.A. in 1974. Johnson then moved on to a Ph.D. at Harvard University with Mark Ptashne working on the role of the Cro protein in regulating the phage lytic cycle. In 1981, Johnson moved to the University of California, San Francisco to work as a postdoctoral fellow in the laboratory of Ira Herskowitz, working on gene regulation in the model yeast Saccharomyces cerevisiae. Johnson remained at the University of California, being appointed assistant professor in 1985, associate professor in 1991, full professor in 1995, and Vice Chair of the Department of Microbiology and Immunology in 2003.

== Research ==
Alexander Johnson is known for his work on gene regulation and cell biology in the yeast Candida albicans. Johnson's research group discovered a sexual mating cycle in C. albicans and characterized the genetic switch between the two C. albicans forms: white and opaque. His group has also investigated genes that allow C. albicans to survive and replicate inside mammalian hosts.

== Notable publications ==
- Noble SM, French S... Johnson AD (2010). Systematic screens of a Candida albicans homozygous deletion library decouple morphogenetic switching and pathogenicity. Nature Genetics. 42(7): pgs. 590–598
- Miller MG, Johnson AS (2002). White-opaque switching in Candida albicans is controlled by mating-type locus homeodomain proteins and allows efficient mating. Cell. 110(3): pgs. 293–302
- Hull CM, Raisner RM, Johnson AD (2000). Evidence for mating of the 'asexual' yeast Candida albicans in a mammalian host. Science. 289(5477): pgs. 307–310
- Braun BR, Johnson AD (1997). Control of filament formation in Candida albicans by the transcriptional repressor TUP1. Science. 277(5322): pgs. 105–109
- Keleher CA, Redd MJ... Johnson AD (1992). Ssn6-Tup1 is a general repressor of transcription in yeast. Cell. 68(4): pgs. 709-719
