= Cryptococcus consortionis =

Scientific classification
- Kingdom: Fungi
- Division: Basidiomycota
- Class: Tremellomycetes
- Order: Tremellales
- Family: Cryptococcaceae
- Genus: Cryptococcus
- Species: C. consortionis

Binomial name
- Cryptococcus consortionis Vishniac, 1985

Species of fungus

Cryptococcus consortionis is a fungus species. It produces colonies that are cream colored with a glistening, mucoid appearance. When grown in liquid media, this species requires constant agitation. This species growth range is from 4 °C to 23 °C, with growth at 23 °C occurring very slowly. On the microscopic level, C. consortionis appears ovoid, with a thin capsule. Sexual reproduction does not occur in this species, but it asexually reproduces through budding at the birth scar site. Very occasionally, the cells have been observed to produce three celled pseudomycelia. C. consortionis does not ferment. This species produces amylose, but it is the only basidioblastomycete which does so but is unable to also assimilate cellobiose, D-galactose, mannitol, myo-inositol and nitrate. C. consortionis is DBB positive. This species required thiamine for proper growth, and its growth is slowed by small amounts of cycloheximide. C. consortionis does not produce urease, and does not produce melanin on DOPA.
