= Mucicarmine stain =

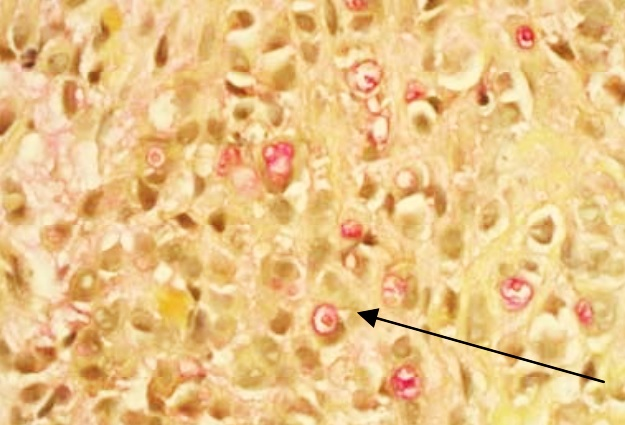
Histopathology of signet ring cell carcinoma of urinary bladder on mucicarmine stain, coloring the mucin within tumor cells pink/red.

Mucicarmine stain is a staining procedure used for different purposes. In microbiology the stain aids in the identification of a variety of microorganisms based on whether or not the cell wall stains intensely red. Generally this is limited to microorganisms with a cell wall that is composed, at least in part, of a polysaccharide component. One of the organisms that is identified using this staining technique is Cryptococcus neoformans.

Another use is in surgical pathology where it can identify mucin. This is helpful, for example, in determining if the cancer is a type that produces mucin.

Example would be to distinguish between high grade Mucoepidermoid Carcinoma of the parotid, which stains positive vs Squamous Cell Carcinoma of the parotid which does not.
