= Merton Bernfield Memorial Award =

The Merton Bernfield Memorial Award, formerly known as the Member Memorial Award For Graduate Students and Postdoctoral Fellows, was established in memory of deceased colleagues donations from members of the American Society for Cell Biology. The winner is selected on merit and is invited to speak in Minisymposium at the ASCB Annual Meeting. The winner also receives financial support.

== Awardees ==
- 2019 Veena Padmanaban
- 2018 Kelsie Eichel
- 2017 Lawrence Kazak
- 2016 Kara McKinley
- 2015 Shigeki Watanabe
- 2014 Prasanna Satpute-Krishnan
- 2013 Panteleimon Rompolas
- 2012 Ting Chen and Gabriel Lander
- 2011 Dylan Tyler Burnette
- 2010 Hua Jin
- 2009 Chad G. Pearson
- 2008 Kenneth Campellone
- 2007 Ethan Garner
- 2006 Lloyd Trotman
- 2005 Stephanie Gupton
- 2004 Chun Han
- 2003 Erik Dent
- 2002 Christina Hull
- 2001 Sarah South and James Wohlschlegel

== See also ==
- List of biology awards
