= Flucytosine =

Chemical compound

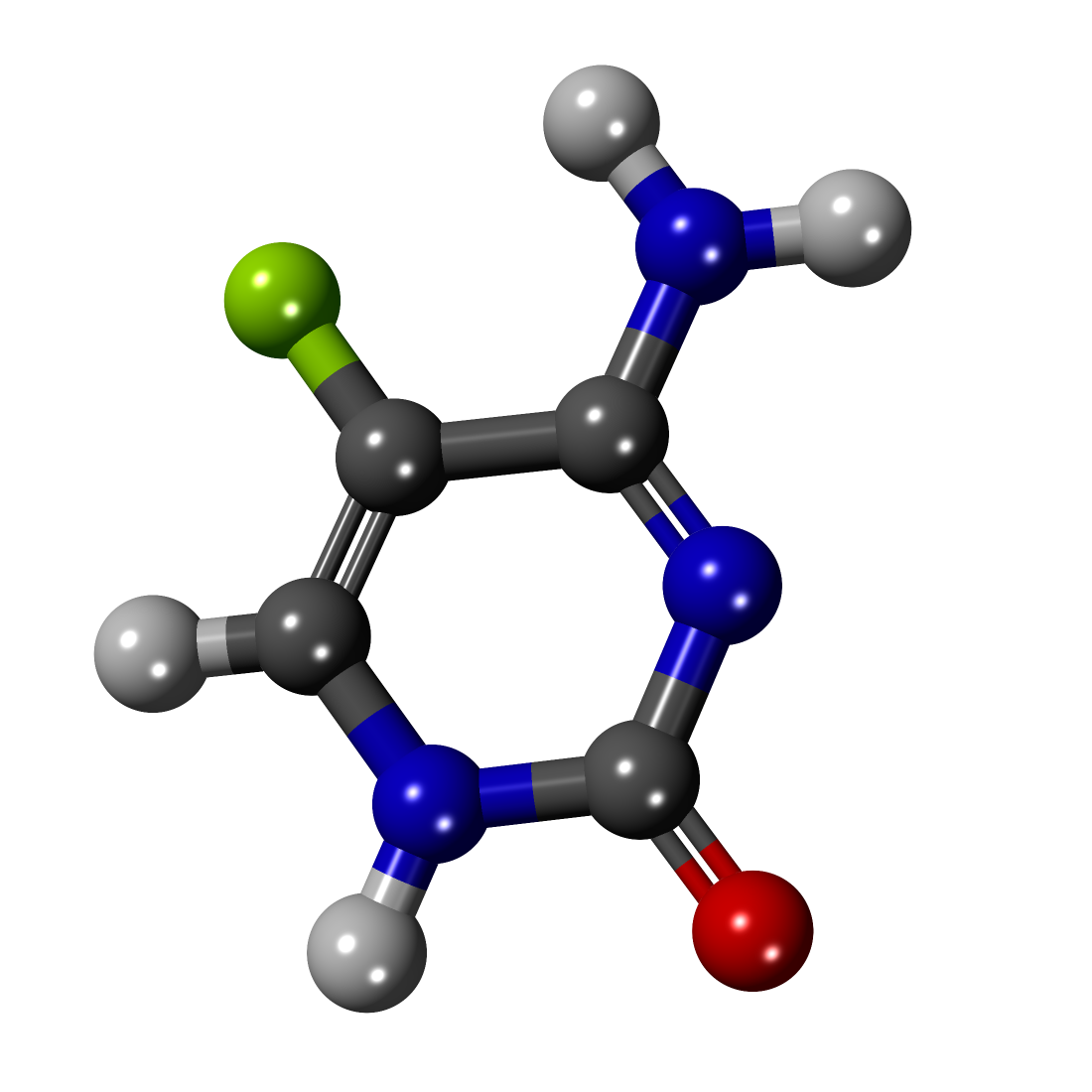

Clinical data
- Trade names: Ancobon, Ancotil, others
- AHFS/Drugs.com: Monograph
- MedlinePlus: a601132
- Pregnancy category: AU: B3
- Routes of administration: By mouth, intravenous
- ATC code: D01AE21 (WHO) J02AX01 (WHO)

Legal status
- Legal status: UK: POM (Prescription only); US: ℞-only

Pharmacokinetic data
- Bioavailability: 75 to 90% (by mouth)
- Protein binding: 2.9 to 4%
- Metabolism: minimal, in the GI tract
- Elimination half-life: 2.4 to 4.8 hours
- Excretion: kidney (90%)

Identifiers
- IUPAC name: 4-amino-5-fluoro-1,2-dihydropyrimidin-2-one
- CAS Number: 2022-85-7
- PubChem CID: 3366
- DrugBank: DB01099
- ChemSpider: 3249
- UNII: D83282DT06
- KEGG: D00323
- ChEBI: CHEBI:5100
- ChEMBL: ChEMBL1463
- CompTox Dashboard (EPA): DTXSID3023059
- ECHA InfoCard: 100.016.336

Chemical and physical data
- Formula: C_{4}H_{4}FN_{3}O
- Molar mass: 129.094 g·mol^{−1}
- 3D model (JSmol): Interactive image
- Melting point: 295 to 297 °C (563 to 567 °F) (dec.)
- SMILES: Nc1[nH]c(=O)ncc1F
- InChI: InChI=1S/C4H4FN3O/c5-2-1-7-4(9)8-3(2)6/h1H,(H3,6,7,8,9); Key:XRECTZIEBJDKEO-UHFFFAOYSA-N

Flucytosine, also known as 5-fluorocytosine (5-FC), is an antifungal medication. It is specifically used, together with amphotericin B, for serious Candida infections and cryptococcosis. It may be used by itself or with other antifungals for chromomycosis. Flucytosine is used by mouth and by injection into a vein.

Common side effects include bone marrow suppression, loss of appetite, diarrhea, vomiting, and psychosis. Anaphylaxis and other allergic reactions occasionally occur. It is unclear if use in pregnancy is safe for the baby. Flucytosine is in the fluorinated pyrimidine analogue family of medications. It works by being converted into fluorouracil inside the fungus, which impairs its ability to make protein.

Flucytosine was first made in 1957. It is on the World Health Organization's List of Essential Medicines. It is not available in much of the developing world.

== Medical uses ==
Flucytosine by mouth is used for the treatment of serious infections caused by susceptible strains of Candida or Cryptococcus neoformans. It can also be used for the treatment of chromomycosis (chromoblastomycosis), if susceptible strains cause the infection. Flucytosine must not be used as a sole agent in life-threatening fungal infections due to relatively weak antifungal effects and fast development of resistance, but rather in combination with amphotericin B and/or azole antifungals such as fluconazole or itraconazole. Minor infections such as candidal cystitis may be treated with flucytosine alone. In some countries, treatment with slow intravenous infusions for no more than a week is also a therapeutic option, particular if the disease is life-threatening.

Serious fungal infections may occur in those who are immunocompromised. These people benefit from combination therapy including flucytosine, but the incidence of side-effects of a combination therapy, particular with amphotericin B, may be higher.

=== Pregnancy and breastfeeding ===
In animal models (rats), flucytosine has been found to be teratogenic. Sufficient human data does not exist. Pregnant women should be given flucytosine only if the potential benefits exceed the potential harm to the fetus.

It is not known if flucytosine is distributed in human breast milk. Given the potential risk to the child, the patient should not breastfeed during treatment with flucytosine.

=== Children ===
The efficacy and safety in patients under 18 years of age has not been determined.

== Side effects ==
- Patients treated with drugs compromising bone marrow function (e.g. cytostatics) should be treated carefully. Blood cell counts should be taken very frequently.
- Patients with renal disease should receive flucytosine cautiously and in reduced doses. Guidelines for proper dosing exist. Serum level determinations are mandatory for these patients.
- All patients receiving flucytosine should be under strict medical supervision.
- Hematological, renal and liver function studies should be done frequently during therapy (initially daily, twice a week for the rest of treatment).
- Patients with preexisting bone marrow depression and liver impairment should be treated with caution.
- Antiproliferative actions on bone marrow and GI tissue: Due to the drug's preference for rapidly proliferating tissues, bone marrow depression (anemia, leukopenia, pancytopenia, or even rarely agranulocytosis) may occur. Aplastic anemia has also been seen. Bone marrow toxicity can be irreversible and may cause death, particularly in immunocompromised patients. GI toxicity may be severe or rarely fatal and consists of anorexia, abdominal bloating, abdominal pain, diarrhea, dry mouth, duodenal ulcer, GI hemorrhage, nausea, vomiting, and ulcerative colitis.
- Liver function: Elevations of liver enzymes and bilirubin, hepatic dysfunction, jaundice and, in one patient, liver necrosis have all been seen. Some fatal cases have been reported; however, the majority of cases was reversible.
- Renal function: Increased BUN and serum creatinine have been noted. Crystalluria (formation of crystals and excretion in the urine) and acute kidney injury have also been seen.
- Adverse central nervous system effects are frequent and include confusion, hallucinations, psychosis, ataxia, hearing loss, headache, paresthesia, parkinsonism, peripheral neuropathy, vertigo and sedation.
- Skin reactions: Rash, pruritus, and photosensitivity have all been noticed. Toxic epidermal necrolysis (Lyell's syndrome) may also be encountered and may be life-threatening.
- Anaphylaxis: Sometimes cases of anaphylaxis consisting of diffuse erythema, pruritus, conjunctival injection, fever, abdominal pain, edema, hypotension and bronchospastic reactions are observed.

It is not known if flucytosine is a human carcinogen. The issue has been raised because traces of 5-fluorouracil, which is a known carcinogen, are found in the colon resulting from the metabolization of flucytosine.

== Interactions ==
Flucytosine may increase the toxicity of amphotericin B and vice versa, although the combination may be life-saving and should be used whenever indicated (e.g., cryptococcal meningitis). The cytostatic cytarabine inhibits the antimycotic activity of flucytosine.

== Overdose ==
Symptoms and their severities are unknown, because flucytosine is used under close medical supervision, but expected to be an excess of the usually encountered side effects on the bone marrow, gastrointestinal tract, liver and kidney function. Vigorous hydration and hemodialysis may be helpful in removing the drug from the body. Hemodialysis is particular useful in patients with impaired renal function.

== Pharmacology ==
=== Mechanisms of action ===
Two major mechanisms of action have been elucidated:

- Flucytosine is intrafungally converted into the cytostatic fluorouracil which undergoes further steps of activation and finally interacts as 5-fluorouridinetriphosphate with RNA biosynthesis thus disturbing the building of certain essential proteins.
- Flucytosine also undergoes conversion into fluorodeoxyuridylate which inhibits fungal DNA synthesis.

=== Spectrum of susceptible fungi and resistance ===
Flucytosine is active in vitro as well as in vivo against some strains of Candida and Cryptococcus. Limited studies demonstrate that flucytosine may be of value against infections with Sporothrix, Aspergillus, Cladosporium, Exophiala, and Phialophora. Resistance is quite commonly seen as well in treatment-naive patients and under current treatment with flucytosine. In different strains of Candida resistance has been noted to occur in 1 to 50% of all specimens obtained from patients.

=== Pharmacokinetic data ===
Flucytosine is well absorbed (75 to 90%) from the gastrointestinal tract. Intake with meals slows the absorption, but does not decrease the amount absorbed. Following an oral dose of 2 grams peak serum levels are reached after approximately 6 hours. The time to peak level decreases with continued therapy. After 4 days peak levels are measured after 2 hours. The drug is eliminated renally. In normal patients flucytosine has reportedly a half-life of 2.5 to 6 hours. In patients with impaired renal function higher serum levels are seen and the drug tends to accumulate. The drug is mainly excreted unchanged in the urine (90% of an oral dose) and only traces are metabolized and excreted in the feces. Therapeutic serum levels range from 25 to 100 μg/ml. Serum levels in excess of 100 μg are associated with a higher incidence of side effects. Periodic measurements of serum levels are recommended for all patients and are a must in patients with renal damage.

== Economics ==
Although a generic, off patent medication in the U.S., as of January 2016, there was only one FDA-approved pharmaceutical supplier, Valeant Pharmaceuticals.In the United Kingdom and Europe its available via Meda AB Pharmaceuticals.

== Other animals ==
In some countries, such as Switzerland, flucytosine has been licensed to treat cats, dogs and birds (in most cases together with amphotericin B) for the same indications as in humans.
