= Vomocytosis =

Cellular process

Vomocytosis (sometimes called non-lytic expulsion) is the cellular process by which phagocytes expel live organisms that they have engulfed without destroying the organism. Vomocytosis is one of many methods used by cells to expel internal materials into their external environment, yet it is distinct in that both the engulfed organism and host cell remain undamaged by expulsion. As engulfed organisms are released without being destroyed, vomocytosis has been hypothesized to be utilized by pathogens as an escape mechanism from the immune system. The exact mechanisms, as well as the repertoire of cells that utilize this mechanism, are currently unknown, yet interest in this unique cellular process is driving continued research with the hopes of elucidating these unknowns.

== Discovery ==
Timelapse movie showing the fungus Cryptococcus neoformans (shown in green in the first frame) being expelled from a chicken macrophage via non-lytic expulsion or vomocytosis.

Vomocytosis was first reported in 2006 by two groups, working simultaneously in the UK and the US, based on time-lapse microscopy footage characterising the interaction between macrophages and the human fungal pathogen Cryptococcus neoformans. Subsequently, this process has also been seen with other fungal pathogens such as Candida albicans and Candida krusei. It has also been speculated that the process may be related to the expulsion of bacterial pathogens such as Mycobacterium marinum from host cells. Vomocytosis has been observed in phagocytic cells from mice, humans and birds, as well as being directly observed in zebrafish and indirectly detected (via flow cytometry) in mice. Amoebae exhibit a similar process to vomocytosis whereby phagosomal material that cannot be digested is exocytosed. Cryptococci are exocytosed from amoebae via this mechanism but inhibition of the constitutive pathway demonstrated that cryptococci could also be expelled via vomocytosis.

== Mechanism ==
A full understanding of the mechanisms involved in vomocytosis is not currently known, yet advances in research have driven initial mechanistic descriptions and crucial steps involved in the process. Research has shown vomocytosis does not occur when pathogens are dead or when engulfed materials are non-living, indicating the survival of phagosomal cargo may be crucial for triggering or enhancing vomocytosis. Additionally, the phagosomal pH may play important roles in vomocytosis efficacy as research has demonstrated vomocytosis rates drop as phagocytes become more acidic and vomocytosis is increased by the addition of weak bases to phagocytes. The membrane composition and cellular state are implicated in vomocytosis as vomocytosis has been shown to decrease with membrane permiability and increase in states of autophagy. Furthermore, inflammatory signals such as Type I interferons, which are produced in response to viral infections, are known to enhance vomocytosis. The impacts of these described forces on inducing vomocytosis are still being elaborated, and it is likely that they are variable based on other unknown external and internal factors.

Just as in standard exocytosis, rearrangements of the actin cytoskeleton within the host cell are crucial for allowing vomocytosis to occur. In contrast to standard exocytosis, the engulfed pathogen is not lysed by internal components of the host cell, and the vesicle is brought close to the cellular membrane where it can fuse and release the pathogen cargo. Annexin A2, a membrane-bound protein, helps regulate vomocytosis and promote the fusing of vesicles to the plasma membranes. In annexin A2 deficient cell lines, rates of vomocytosis were decreased. Furthermore, screens of macrophage kinase inhibitors revealed signaling pathways linked to vomocytosis. ERK5, involved in the MAPK signaling pathway that communicates surface signals to cellular DNA, was shown to suppress vomocytosis. Additional signaling pathways involved in vomocytosis have yet to be determined. Furthermore, different morphologies of vomocytosis have been documented and it is possible that the underlying cellular mechanism may vary between them.

== Biological significance ==
Research has been devoted to understanding the mechanisms and importance of vomocytosis as it is hypothesized to be linked to many significant biological processes. Vomocytosis plays a role in lateral transfer, a process by which cells transfer engulfed cargo to a neighboring recipient cell, as initial cells expel their cargo undamaged so they can be uptaken by recipient cells. Additionally, vomocytosis is hypothesized to be utilized as an escape mechanism by pathogens as it allows them to evade degradation by macrophages. Since there is no damage to host cells or pathogens during vomocytosis, the immune system is not triggered, which allows for further potential evasion from hosts. More research is necessary to determine whether vomocytosis is initiated by engulfed pathogens for this purpose or by host cells and this is simply an unintentional benefit to pathogens. An additional hypothesis is that vomocytosis may enhance pathogenesis or spread of a pathogen as they are engulfed by macrophages and later expelled in locations that may potentially be different from the site of acute infection. Enhancing our understanding of host-pathogen interactions will clarify our understanding of vomocytosis's role in infection progression. Lastly, vomocytosis has been implicated in tumor response as tumor-associated macrophages (TAMs) are speculated to be able to modulate the tumor microenvironment (TME) via vomocytosis. Better understanding the mechanisms of inducing and regulating vomocytosis will enhance our knowledge of host-pathogen and host-self interactions, allowing for advances in our ability to respond to infections and tumors.
