= Leah E. Cowen =

Canadian mycologist

Vice-President, Research & Innovation, and Strategic Initiatives of the University of Toronto
- Incumbent
- Assumed office January 1, 2022
- President: Meric Gertler; Melanie Woodin

Academic background
- Education: BSc; PhD
- Alma mater: University of British Columbia; University of Toronto
- Thesis: Population genomics of drug resistance in the pathogenic yeast Candida albicans. (2002)

Leah Elizabeth Cowen is a Canadian mycologist and the Vice-President, Research and Innovation, and Strategic Initiatives at the University of Toronto.

== Early life and education ==
Cowen earned her Bachelor of Science degree from the University of British Columbia and her PhD from the University of Toronto (U of T). During this time, she received a postgraduate scholarship from the Natural Sciences and Engineering Research Council and completed her postdoctoral fellowship at the Whitehead Institute. While at MIT, she also received the 2005 Genzyme Postdoctoral Fellowship.

== Career ==
Cowen returned to her alma mater, U of T, in 2007 as an assistant professor in the department of molecular genetics. While serving in this role, her laboratory showed that growth of the Candida albicans fungus was tied to the function of heat-shock protein 90 (Hsp90). In 2012, Cowen was appointed a Canada Research Chair (CRC) in Microbial Genomics and Infectious Disease. As a CRC, Cowen began using specialized genomics technology to examine how fungal pathogens become resistant to drugs and cause human disease. She also became the co-director of the Canadian Institute for Advanced Research program "Fungal Kingdom: Threats & Opportunities" and was the co-founder and chief scientific officer of biotechnology firm Bright Angel Therapeutics. As such, Cowen received a 2015 Natural Sciences and Engineering Research Council E.W.R. Steacie Memorial Fellowships.

In 2018, Cowen was re-appointed a Tier 1 Canada Research Chair in Microbial Genomics & Infectious Disease. In November 2020, Cowen was appointed the University of Toronto’s first associate vice-president of research. She was also elected a fellow of the American Association for the Advancement of Science in the same month. The following year, Cowen was named one of four new editors for the blog Genes to Genomes run through the Genetics Society of America.
