= Kwoniella =

Scientific classification
- Kingdom: Fungi
- Division: Basidiomycota
- Class: Tremellomycetes
- Order: Tremellales
- Family: Cryptococcaceae
- Genus: Kwoniella; Statzell & Fell (2008)

Type species
- Kwoniella mangrovensis

Genus of fungi

Kwoniella is a genus of fungi in the family Cryptococcaceae. The genus originally contained the single species Kwoniella mangrovensis, found in the Florida Everglades and The Bahamas. Molecular research, based on cladistic analysis of DNA sequences, has however, now extended the genus to eleven species, most known only from their yeast states.

The genus was named in recognition of Dr K.J. Kwon-Chung for her research contributions to the Tremellales.
