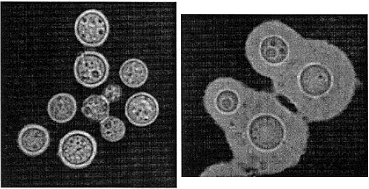
- Cryptococcus neoformans weakly encapsulated (left) as it appears in nature, and (right) rehydrated with thick polysaccharide capsule as it appears once in the lungs

Scientific classification
- Kingdom: Fungi
- Division: Basidiomycota
- Class: Tremellomycetes
- Order: Tremellales
- Family: Cryptococcaceae
- Genus: Cryptococcus
- Species: C. gattii

Binomial name
- Cryptococcus gattii (Vanbreus. & Takashio) Kwon-Chung & Boekhout

= Cryptococcus gattii =

Species of fungus

Cryptococcus gattii, formerly known as Cryptococcus neoformans var. gattii, is an encapsulated yeast fungus found primarily in tropical and subtropical climates. Its teleomorph is Filobasidiella bacillispora, a filamentous fungus belonging to the class Tremellomycetes.

C. gattii is one of two organisms causing the infectious disease cryptococcosis (along with C. neoformans). Clinical manifestations of C. gattii infection include pulmonary cryptococcosis (lung infection), basal meningitis, and cerebral cryptococcomas. Occasionally, the fungus is associated with skin, soft tissue, lymph node, bone, and joint infections. In recent years, it has appeared in British Columbia, Canada and the Pacific Northwest. It has been suggested that tsunamis, such as the 1964 Alaska earthquake and tsunami, might have been responsible for carrying the fungus to North America and its subsequent spread there. From 1999 through to early 2008, 216 people in British Columbia have been infected with C. gattii, and eight died from complications related to it. The fungus also infects animals, such as dogs, koalas, and dolphins. In 2007, the fungus appeared for the first time in the United States, in Whatcom County, Washington, and in April 2010 had spread to Oregon. The most recently identified strain, designated VGIIc, is particularly virulent, having proved fatal in 19 of 218 known cases.

== Nomenclature ==
Cryptococcus gattii has recently been divided into five species. These are C. gattii, C. bacillisporus, C. deuterogattii, C. tetragattii, and C. decagattii.

== Etymology ==
The genus name Cryptococcus comes from Ancient Greek κρυπτός (kruptós), meaning "hidden", and κόκκος (kókkos), meaning "grain". The specific name gattii comes from Italian mycologist Franco Gatti.

== Environmental microbiology ==
C. gattii occupies an environmental niche in decaying hollows of trees native to tropical as well as subtropical and temperate regions. It may then contaminate nearby soil or persist in wood products.

=== Distribution ===
Soil debris associated with certain tree species has been found frequently to contain C. gattii VGIII MATα and MATa, and less commonly VGI MATα, in Southern California. These isolates were fertile, were found to be indistinguishable from the human isolates by genome sequence, and were virulent in in vitro and animal tests. Isolates were found associated with Canary Island pine (Pinus canariensis), American sweetgum (Liquidambar styraciflua), and Pohutukawa tree (Metrosideros excelsa).

One study concluded "[j]ust as people who travel to South America are told to be careful about drinking the water, people who visit other areas like California, the Pacific Northwest, and Oregon need to be aware that they are at risk for developing a fungal infection, especially if their immune system is compromised."

== Epidemiology ==
C. gattii infections were initially thought to be restricted to tropical and subtropical regions. C. gattii is the predominant cause of cryptococcosis in sub-Saharan Africa. The highest incidences of C. gattii infections occur in Papua New Guinea and Northern Australia. However cases have been reported in various other regions including Brazil, India and the Pacific Northwest of North America. The spread of this fungus is hypothesized to be linked to climate change.

In the North America, there are now two strains of this fungus in the northwestern part of the region, affecting many terrestrial animals. C. gattii serotype B, subtype VGIIa, is largely responsible for clinical cases. The VGIIa subtype was responsible for the outbreaks in Canada; it then appeared in the U.S. Pacific Northwest.

According to a CDC summary, from 2004 to 2010, 60 cases were identified in the U.S.: 43 in Oregon, 15 in Washington, and one each in Idaho and California. Slightly more than half of these cases were immunocompromised; 92% of all isolates were of the VGIIa subtype. In 2007, the first case in North Carolina was reported, subtype VGI, which is identical to the isolates found in Australia and California.

The multiple clonal clusters in the Pacific Northwest likely arose independently of each other as a result of sexual reproduction occurring within the highly sexual VGII population. VGII C. gattii have probably undergone either bisexual or unisexual reproduction in multiple different locales, thus giving rise to novel virulent phenotypes.

== Pathology ==
C. gattii is notable for causing cryptococcosis in otherwise healthy persons. Unlike Cryptococcus neoformans, C. gattii is not particularly associated with human immunodeficiency virus infection or other forms of immunosuppression. Increased virulence may be related to a capability to rapidly proliferate within lymphocytes.

C. gattii infection is more likely to be limited to the lung (rather than disseminating to the CNS). When CNS infection does occur, it may involve more localised lesions (cryptococcomas) rather than the diffuse infection characteristic of C. neoformans.

== Diagnosis ==
Culture of sputum, bronchoalveolar lavage, lung biopsy, cerebrospinal fluid or brain biopsy specimens on selective agar allows differentiation between the five members of the C. gattii species complex and the two members of the C. neoformans species complex. The optimal growth temperature of C. gattii is 30 °C (86 °F).

== Treatment ==
Medical treatment consists of prolonged intravenous therapy (for 6–8 weeks or longer) with the antifungal drug amphotericin B, either in its conventional or lipid formulation. The addition of oral or intravenous flucytosine improves response rates. Oral fluconazole is then administered for six months or more.

Antifungals alone are often insufficient to cure C. gattii infections, and surgery to resect infected lung (lobectomy) or brain is often required. Ventricular shunts and Ommaya reservoirs are sometimes employed in the treatment of central nervous system infection.

People who have C. gattii infection need to take prescription antifungal medication for at least 6 months; usually the type of treatment depends on the severity of the infection and the parts of the body that are affected.

- For people who have asymptomatic infections or mild-to-moderate pulmonary infections, the treatment is usually fluconazole.
- For people who have severe lung infections, or infections in the central nervous system (brain and spinal cord), the treatment is amphotericin B in combination with flucytosine.
