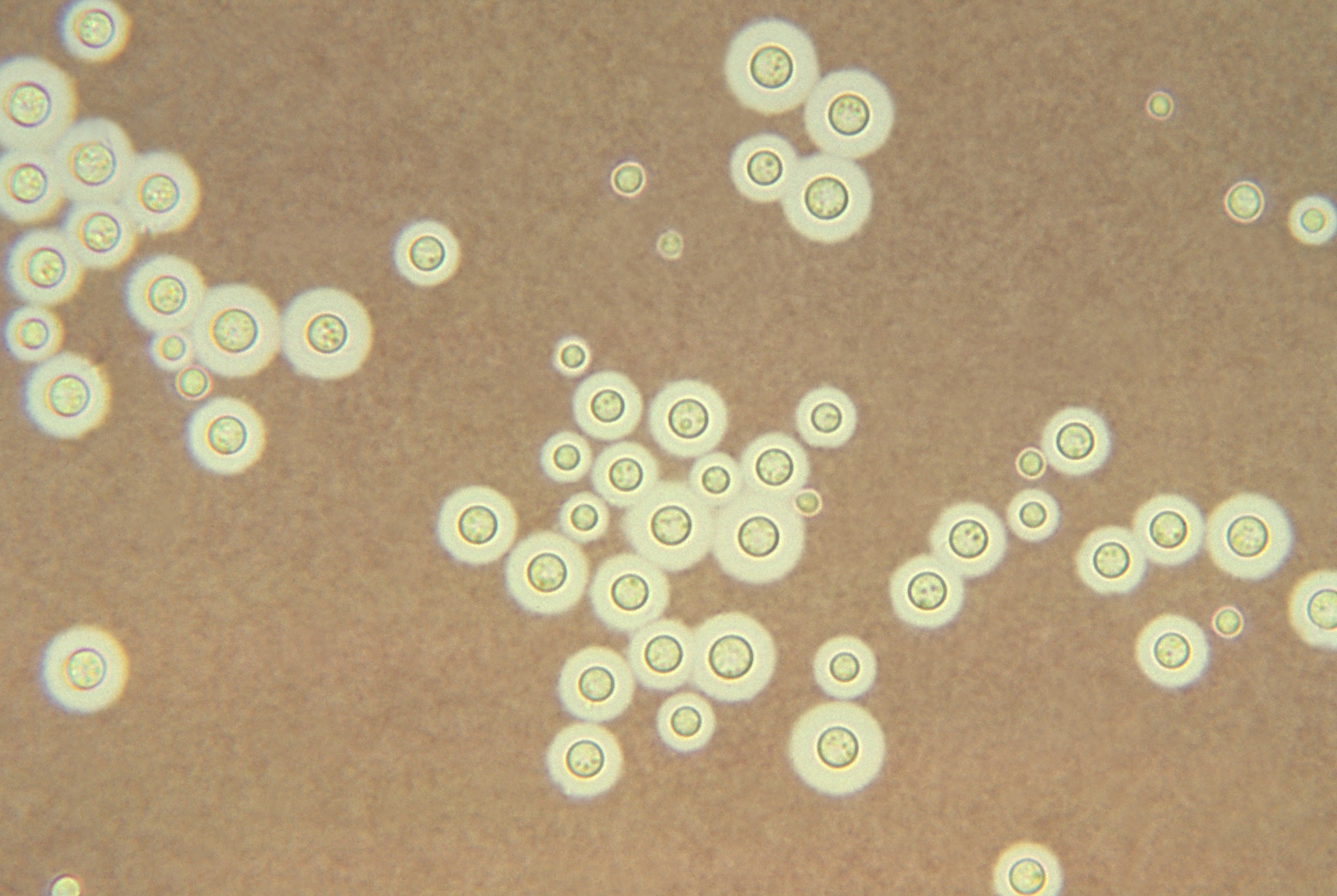
- Yeast state of Cryptococcus neoformans

Scientific classification
- Kingdom: Fungi
- Division: Basidiomycota
- Class: Tremellomycetes
- Order: Tremellales
- Family: Cryptococcaceae
- Genus: Cryptococcus
- Species: C. neoformans

Binomial name
- Cryptococcus neoformans (San Felice) Vuill. (1901)

Synonyms
- Saccharomyces neoformans San Felice (1895); Filobasidiella neoformans Kwon-Chung (1975)

= Cryptococcus neoformans =

Soil fungus that can cause disease

Cryptococcus neoformans is an encapsulated basidiomycetous yeast belonging to the class Tremellomycetes and an obligate aerobe that can live in both plants and animals. Its teleomorph is a filamentous fungus, formerly referred to Filobasidiella neoformans. In its yeast state, it is often found in bird excrement. It has remarkable genomic plasticity and genetic variability between its strains, making treatment of the disease it causes difficult. Cryptococcus neoformans causes disease primarily in immunocompromised hosts, such as HIV or cancer patients. In addition, it has been shown to cause disease in apparently immunocompetent hosts, especially in developed countries.

== Classification ==
Cryptococcus neoformans has undergone numerous nomenclature revisions since its first description in 1895. It formerly contained two varieties: C. neoformans var. neoformans and C. neoformans var. grubii. A third variety, C. neoformans var. gattii, was later defined as a distinct species, Cryptococcus gattii. The most recent classification system divides these varieties into seven species. C. neoformans refers to C. neoformans var. grubii. A new species name, Cryptococcus deneoformans, is used for the former C. neoformans var. neoformans. C. gattii is divided into five species.

The teleomorph was first described in 1975 by K.J. Kwon-Chung, who obtained cultures of Filobasidiella neoformans by crossing strains of the yeast C. neoformans. She was able to observe basidia similar to those of the genus Filobasidium, hence the name Filobasidiella for the new genus. Following changes to the International Code of Nomenclature for algae, fungi, and plants, the practice of giving different names to teleomorph and anamorph forms of the same fungus was discontinued, meaning that Filobasidiella neoformans became a synonym of the earlier name Cryptococcus neoformans.

== Etymology ==
The genus name Cryptococcus comes from Ancient Greek κρυπτός (kruptós), meaning "hidden", and κόκκος (kókkos), meaning "grain". The specific name neoformans comes from Latin neo-, meaning "new", and fōrmāns, meaning "shaping".

== Characteristics ==
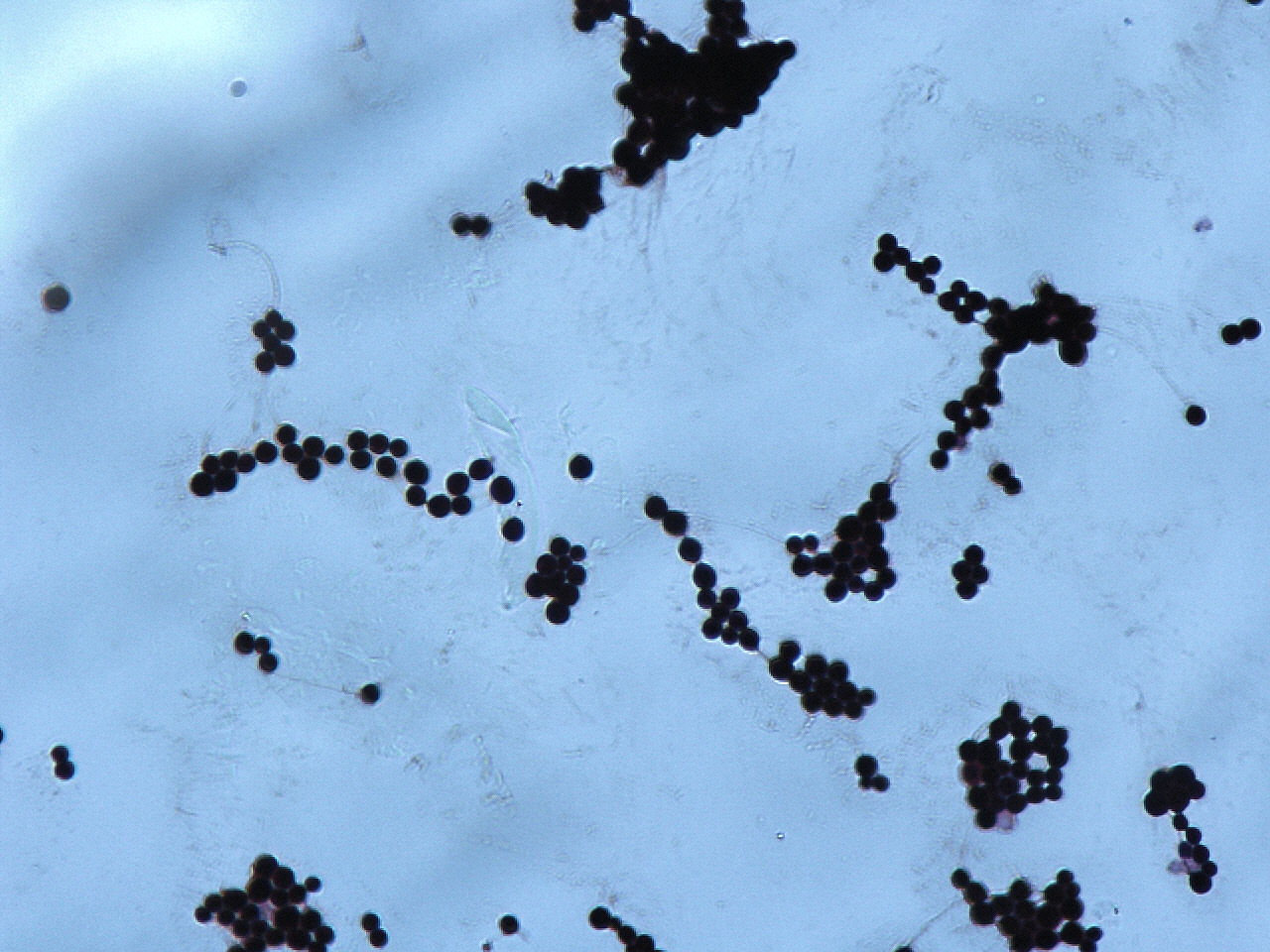
C. neoformans stained by Gram stain

Cryptococcus neoformans typically grows as a yeast (unicellular) and replicates by budding. It makes hyphae during mating, and eventually creates basidiospores at the end of the hyphae before producing spores. Under host-relevant conditions, including low glucose, serum, 5% carbon dioxide, and low iron, among others, the cells produce a characteristic polysaccharide capsule. The recognition of C. neoformans in Gram-stained smears of purulent exudates may be hampered by the presence of the large, gelatinous capsule, which apparently prevents definitive staining of the yeast-like cells. In such stained preparations, it may appear either as round cells with Gram-positive granular inclusions impressed upon a pale lavender cytoplasmic background or as Gram-negative lipoid bodies. When grown as a yeast, C. neoformans has a prominent capsule composed mostly of polysaccharides. Under the microscope, the India ink stain is used for easy visualization of the capsule in cerebral spinal fluid. The particles of ink pigment do not enter the capsule that surrounds the spherical yeast cell, resulting in a zone of clearance or "halo" around the cells. This allows for quick and easy identification of C. neoformans. Unusual morphological forms are rarely seen. For identification in tissue, mucicarmine stain provides specific staining of polysaccharide cell wall in C. neoformans. Cryptococcal antigen from cerebrospinal fluid is thought to be the best test for diagnosis of cryptococcal meningitis in terms of sensitivity, though it might be unreliable in HIV-positive patients.

The first genome sequence for a strain of C. neoformans (var. neoformans; now C. deneoformans) was published in 2005.

Studies suggest that colonies of C. neoformans and related fungi growing within the ruins of the Chernobyl Nuclear Power Plant may be able to metabolize ionizing radiation.

== Pathology ==
Infection with C. neoformans is termed cryptococcosis. Most infections with C. neoformans occur in the lungs, as the fungus enters its host through the respiratory route. Because it is normally a harmless soil fungus, C. neoformans must first adapt to its new environment inside the human body, making several virulent transformations, including the formation of a polysaccharide capsule. The specific factors that enable this transformation involve sensory receptor proteins common to most soil fungi (pH sensors, carbon dioxide sensors, and intracellular iron detectors) which have been adapted to induce C. neoformans cells into rapidly becoming a dangerous, disease-causing organism.

The fungus is a facultative intracellular pathogen that can utilize host phagocytes to spread within the body. C. neoformans was the first intracellular pathogen for which the non-lytic escape process termed vomocytosis was observed. It has been speculated that this ability to manipulate host cells results from environmental selective pressure by amoebae, a hypothesis first proposed by Arturo Casadevall under the term "accidental virulence".

In human infection, C. neoformans is spread by inhalation of aerosolized basidiospores or dehydrated fungal cells, and can disseminate to the central nervous system, where it can cause meningoencephalitis. In the lungs, C. neoformans cells are phagocytosed by alveolar macrophages. Macrophages produce oxidative and nitrosative agents, creating a hostile environment, to kill invading pathogens. Some C. neoformans cells, though, can survive intracellularly in macrophages because of the protective nature of the polysaccharide capsule, as well as its ability to produce melanin. Alongside capsule and melanin, production of urease also plays a true role in virulence of C. neoformans, especially in facilitating intracellular survival. As urease inhibits the full acidification of the phagolysosome through neutralization of the acidic environment of the phagolysosome, where urea is being degraded into CO_{2} and ammonia. Intracellular survival appears to be one of the factors contributing to latency, disseminated disease, and resistance to eradication by antifungal agents. One mechanism by which C. neoformans survives the hostile intracellular environment of the macrophage involves upregulation of expression of genes involved in responses to oxidative stress.

Traversal of the blood–brain barrier by C. neoformans plays a key role in meningitis pathogenesis, but the precise mechanisms by which it passes the blood-brain barrier are still unknown; a 2014 study in rats suggested an important role of secreted serine proteases. The metalloprotease Mpr1 has been demonstrated to be critical in blood-brain barrier penetration.

=== AIDS ===
Fungal meningitis and encephalitis are frequently associated with HIV-positive patients with low T-cell counts. C. neoformans infection is one of the illnesses that definitionally marks the point at which a person with HIV may be considered to have AIDS. Infections with this fungus are rare in immune-competent individuals, hence C. neoformans is often referred to as an opportunistic pathogen. A study from 2024 done in Australia and New Zealand showed the vast majority of recorded infections were in patients whose immune systems were compromised by HIV, cancer treatment, organ transplantation, or other conditions.

=== Changes in reproductive pattern ===
The vast majority of environmental and clinical isolates of C. neoformans are mating type alpha. Filaments of mating type alpha have haploid nuclei ordinarily, but these can undergo a process of diploidization (perhaps by endoduplication or stimulated nuclear fusion) to form diploid cells termed blastospores. The diploid nuclei of blastospores are able to undergo meiosis, including recombination, to form haploid basidiospores that can then be dispersed. This process is referred to as monokaryotic fruiting. Required for this process is a gene designated Dmc1, a conserved homologue of genes RecA in bacteria and Rad51 in eukaryotes. Dmc1 with Rad51 mediates homologous chromosome pairing during meiosis. One benefit of meiosis in C. neoformans could be to promote DNA repair in the DNA-damaging environment caused by the oxidative and nitrosative agents produced in macrophages. Thus, C. neoformans can undergo a meiotic process, monokaryotic fruiting, that may promote recombinational repair in the oxidative, DNA-damaging environment of the host macrophage, and this may contribute to its virulence.

== Serious complications of human infection ==
Infection begins in the lungs, and from there, the fungus can disseminate to the brain and other body parts via macrophages. An infection of the brain caused by C. neoformans is referred to as cryptococcal meningitis, which is most often fatal when left untreated. Cryptococcal meningitis causes more than 180,000 deaths annually, making it a critical priority on the World Health Organization fungal priority list. Brain infections may also be present as abscesses known as cryptococcomas, subdural effusions, isolated cranial nerve lesions, and spinal cord lesions. The estimated one-year mortality of people with HIV receiving treatment for cryptococcal meningitis is 70% in low-income countries versus 20–30% for high-income countries.

Symptoms include headache, fever, neck stiffness, nausea and vomiting, and photophobia. Diagnosis methods include a serum cryptococcal antigen test and lumbar puncture with cerebrospinal fluid (CSF) examination to detect C. neoformans.

== Treatment ==
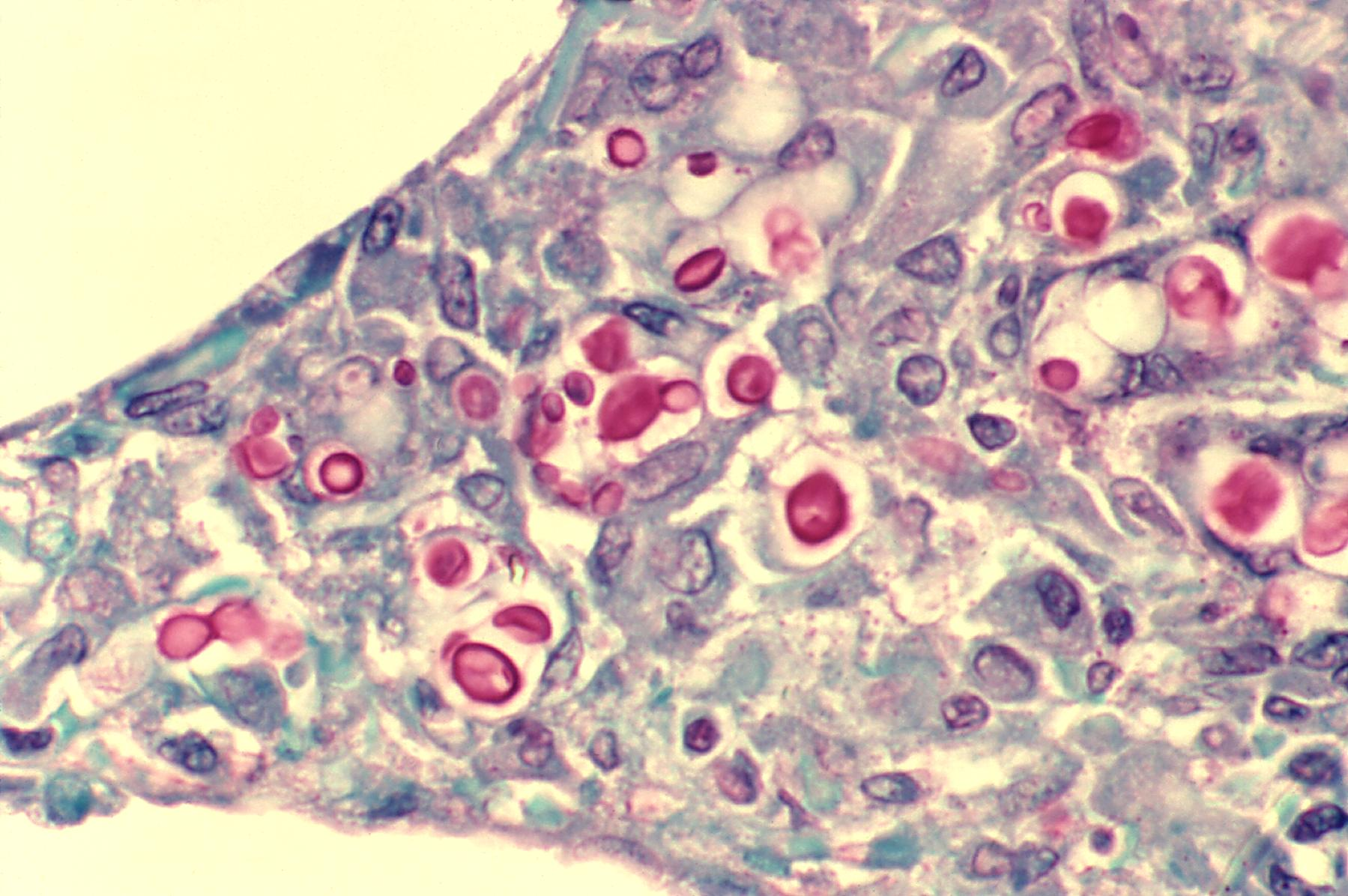
C. neoformans seen in the lung of a patient with AIDS: Mucicarmine stain is used in this case, staining the inner capsule of the organism red.

Cryptococcosis that does not affect the central nervous system can be treated with fluconazole alone.

In 2000, cryptococcal meningitis was recommended to be treated for two weeks with intravenous amphotericin B 0.7–1.0 mg/kg per day and oral flucytosine 100 mg/kg per day (or intravenous flucytosine 75 mg/kg per day if the patient is unable to swallow), followed by oral fluconazole 400–800 mg daily for ten weeks and then 200 mg daily for at least one year and until the patient's CD4 count is above 200 cells/μl. Flucytosine is a generic, off-patent medicine, but the cost of two weeks of flucytosine therapy is about US$10,000, so that flucytosine has been unavailable in low- and middle-income countries. In 1970, flucytosine was available in Africa. A dose of 200 mg/kg per day of flucytosine is associated with more side effects, but is not more effective.

A single high dose of liposomal amphotericin B with 14 days of flucytosine and fluconazole is recommended by the newest WHO guideline for cryptococcal meningitis. A new study found that brain glucose can trigger amphotericin B (AmB) tolerance of C. neoformans during meningitis, which means it needs longer treatment time to kill the fungal cells. The study found that the brain glucose induced AmB tolerance of C. neoformans via glucose repression activator Mig1. Mig1 inhibits the production of ergosterol, the target of AmB, and promotes the production of inositol phosphoryl ceramide (IPC), which competes with AmB for ergosterol to limit AmB efficacy in mouse brain and human CSF. Strikingly, results of this study indicated that IPC synthase inhibitor aureobasidin A (AbA) can enhance the anticryptococcal activity of AmB. AbA+AmB AmB had an even better therapeutic effect in a mouse model of cryptococcal meningitis than AmB+flucytosine, which may bring new hope for the treatment of cryptococcal meningitis.

In Africa, oral fluconazole at a rate of 200 mg daily is often used, but this does not result in cure, because it merely suppresses the fungus and does not kill it; viable fungus can continue to be grown from CSF of patients not having taken fluconazole for many months. An increased dose of 400 mg daily does not improve outcomes, but prospective studies from Uganda and Malawi reported that higher doses of 1200 mg per day have more fungicidal activity. The outcomes with fluconazole monotherapy have 30% worse survival than amphotericin-based therapies, in a recent systematic review.

The current options for cryptococcosis are not optimal for treatment. AmB is highly toxic to humans, and both fluconazole and flucytosine have been shown to cause development of drug resistance in C. neoformans. A study from 2024 suggested brilacidin as an alternative treatment option. Brilacidin was shown to be nontoxic and caused no drug resistance development in C. neoformans, while still being efficient at causing fungal mortality. Brilacidin enhances permiability of the cell wall and membrane by binding to ergosterol and disrupting its distribution. It also affects the cell wall integrity pathway and disrupts calcium metabolism. Through these methods, it not only causes cell mortality on its own, but also enables more effective use of other antifungal agents such as AmB against C. neoformans.
