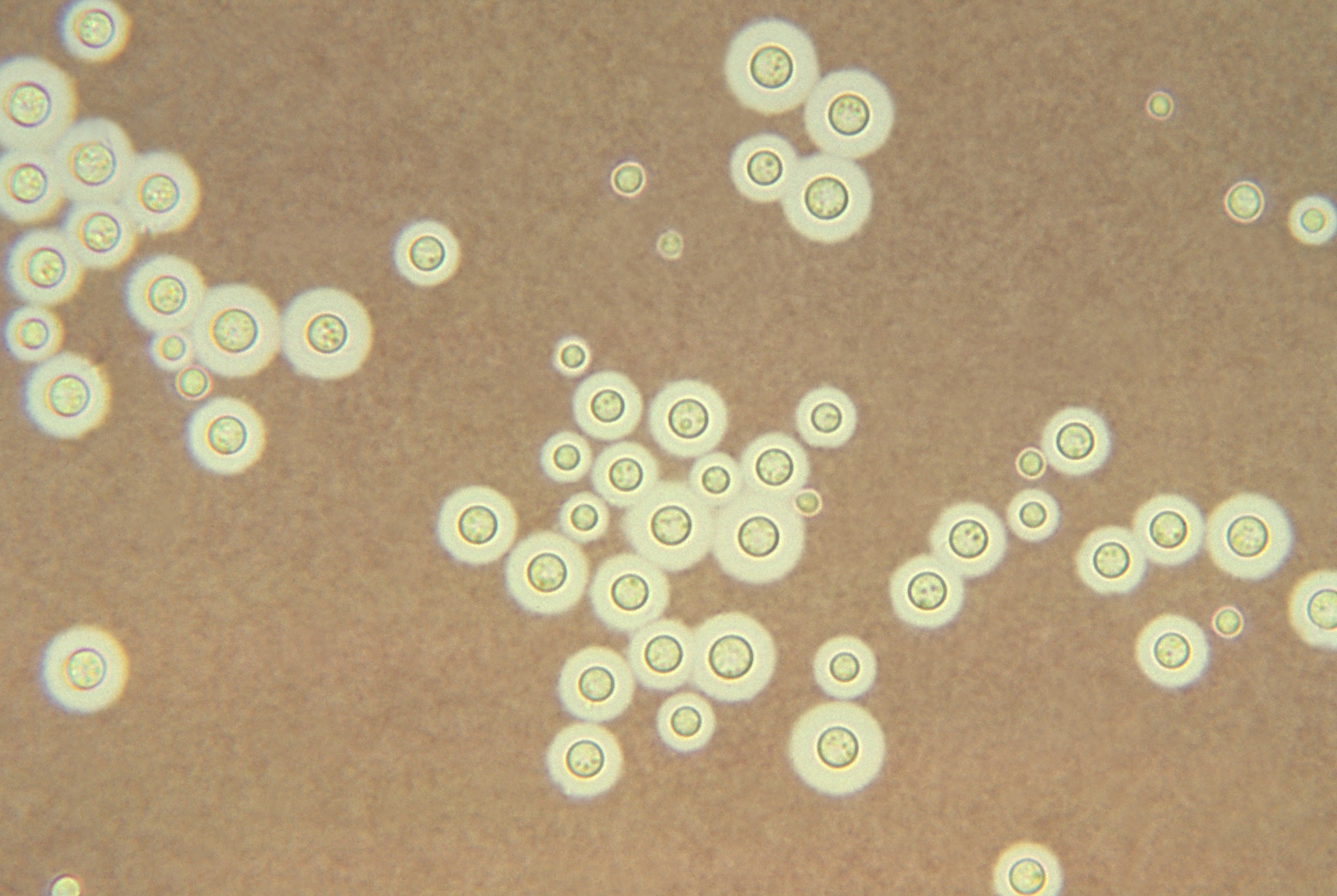
- Yeast state of Cryptococcus neoformans

Scientific classification
- Kingdom: Fungi
- Division: Basidiomycota
- Class: Tremellomycetes
- Order: Tremellales
- Family: Cryptococcaceae
- Genus: Cryptococcus; Vuill. (1901)

Type species
- Cryptococcus neoformans

Species
- see text

Synonyms
- Filobasidiella Kwon-Chung (1975); Tsuchiyaea Y.Yamada, H.Kawas., Itoh, I.Banno & Nakase (1988)

= Cryptococcus =

Genus of fungi

Cryptococcus (from Ancient Greek: κρυπτός, romanized: kruptós, lit. 'hidden', and κόκκος, kókkos, 'grain') is a genus of fungi in the family Cryptococcaceae that includes both yeasts and filamentous species. The filamentous, sexual forms or teleomorphs were formerly classified in the genus Filobasidiella, while Cryptococcus was reserved for the yeasts. Most yeast species formerly referred to Cryptococcus have now been placed in different genera. Some Cryptococcus species cause a disease called cryptococcosis.

== Taxonomy ==
The genus was described by French mycologist Jean Paul Vuillemin in 1901, when he failed to find ascospores characteristic of the genus Saccharomyces in the yeast previously known as Saccharomyces neoformans. Over 300 additional names were subsequently added to the genus, almost all of which were later removed following molecular research based on cladistic analysis of DNA sequences. As a result, some 10 species are recognized in Cryptococcus.

The teleomorph was first described in 1975 by K.J. Kwon-Chung, who obtained cultures of the type species, Filobasidiella neoformans, by crossing strains of the yeast Cryptococcus neoformans. She was able to observe basidia similar to those of the genus Filobasidium, hence the name Filobasidiella for the new genus. Following changes to the International Code of Nomenclature for algae, fungi, and plants, the practice of giving different names to teleomorph and anamorph forms of the same fungus was discontinued, meaning that Filobasidiella became a synonym of the earlier name Cryptococcus.

== General characteristics ==
The cells of species that produce yeasts are covered in a thin layer of glycoprotein capsular material that has a gelatin-like consistency, and that among other functions, serves to help extract nutrients from the soil. The C. neoformans capsule consists of several polysaccharides, of which the major one is the immunomodulatory polysaccharide called glucuronoxylomannan (GXM). GXM is made up of the monosaccharides glucuronic acid, xylose and mannose and can also contain O-acetyl groups. The capsule functions as the major virulence factor in cryptococcal infection and disease.

Some Cryptococcus species have a huge diversity at the infraspecific level with different molecular types based on their genetic differences, mainly due to their geographical distribution, molecular characteristics, and ecological niches.

Cryptococcus species are not known to produce distinct, visible fruitbodies. All teleomorph forms appear to be parasites of other fungi. In teleomorphs the hyphae are colourless, are clamped or unclamped, and bear haustorial cells with filaments that attach to the hyphae of host fungi. The basidia are club-shaped and highly elongated. Spores arise in succession from four loci at the apex (which is sometimes partly septate). These spores are passively released and may remain on the basidium in chains, unless disturbed. In the type species, the spores germinate to form yeast cells, but yeast states are not known for all species.

== Habitat, distribution and species ==
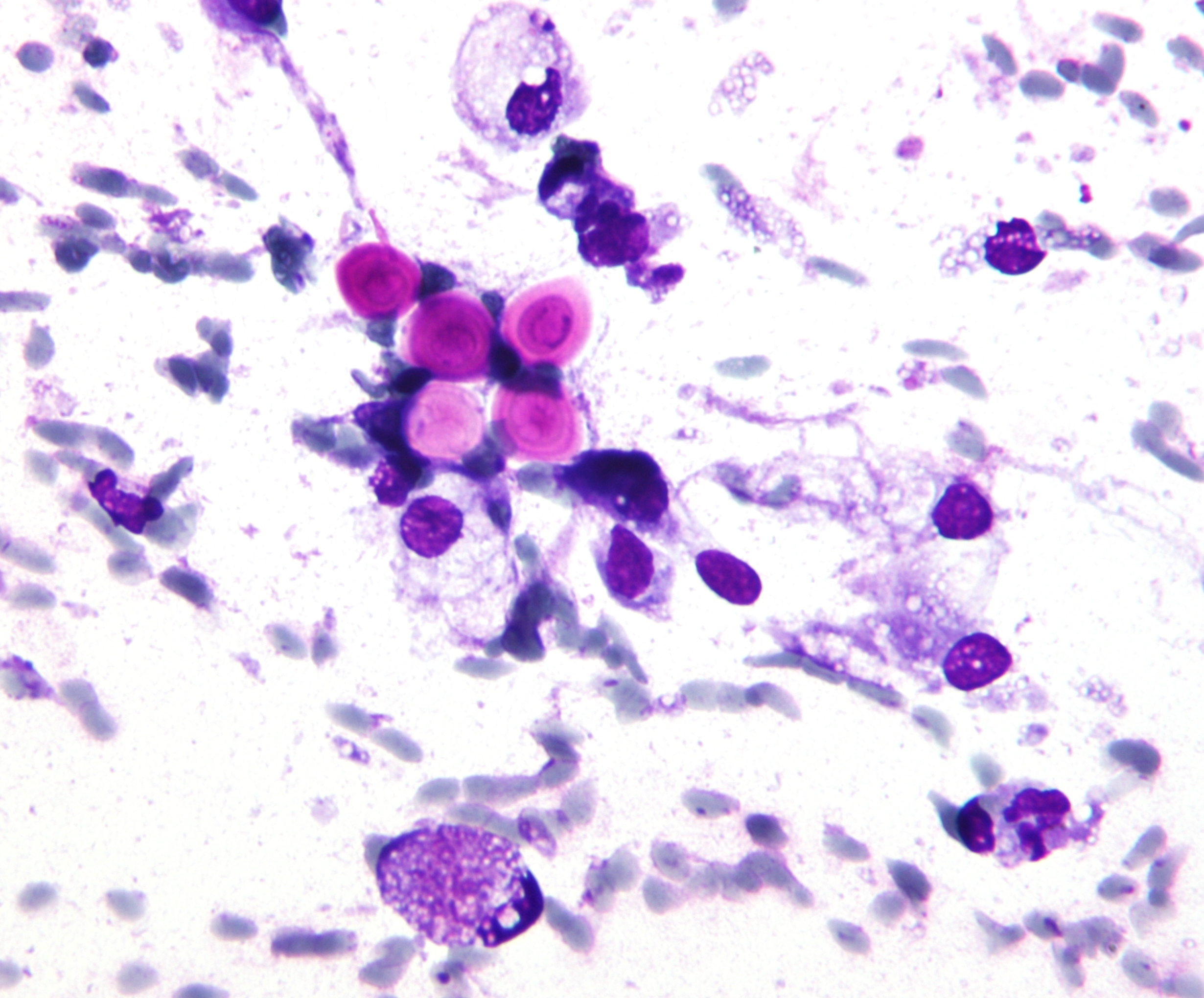
Field stain showing Cryptococcus species in lung tissue

Cryptococcus neoformans is cosmopolitan and is the most prominent medically important species. It is best known for causing a severe form of meningitis and meningoencephalitis in people with HIV/AIDS. It may also infect organ-transplant recipients and people receiving certain cancer treatments. In its yeast state C. neoformans is found in the droppings of wild birds, often pigeons; when dust of the droppings is stirred up, it can infect humans or pets that inhale the dust. Infected humans and animals do not transmit their infection to others. The taxonomy of C. neoformans has been reviewed: it has now been divided into two species: Cryptococcus neoformans sensu stricto and Cryptococcus deneoformans.

Cryptococcus gattii (formerly C. neoformans var. gattii) is endemic to tropical parts of the continent of Africa and Australia. It is capable of causing disease in non-immunocompromised people. In its yeast state it has been isolated from eucalyptus trees in Australia. The taxonomy of C. gattii has been reviewed; it has now been divided into five species: C. gattii sensu stricto, C. bacillisporus, C. deuterogattii, C. tetragattii, and C. decagattii.

Cryptococcus depauperatus is parasitic on Lecanicillium lecanii, an entomopathogenic fungus, and is known from Sri Lanka, England, the Netherlands, the Czech Republic, and Canada. It is not known to produce a yeast state. This species grows as long, branching filaments and is self-fertile, i.e. it is homothallic. It can reproduce sexually with itself throughout its life cycle.

Cryptococcus luteus is parasitic on Granulobasidium vellereum, a corticioid fungus, and is known from England and Italy. It too is not known to produce a yeast state.

Cryptococcus amylolentus was originally isolated as a yeast from beetle tunnels in South African trees. It forms a basidia-bearing teleomorph in culture.

As of April 2025, Species Fungorum (in the Catalogue of Life) accept 41 species of Cryptococcus:

- Cryptococcus amylolentus (Van der Walt, D.B.Scott & Klift) Golubev (1981)
- Cryptococcus asgardensis Vishniac & Baharaeen (1981)
- Cryptococcus aureus (F.C.Harrison) M.Takash., Sugita, Shinoda & Nakase (2003)
- Cryptococcus bacillisporus Kwon-Chung & J.E.Benn. (1978)
- Cryptococcus baldrensis Vishniac & Baharaeen (1982)
- Cryptococcus cavarae Pollacci & Turconi (1929)
- Cryptococcus cellulolyticus Nakase, M.Suzuki, Hamam. & M. Takash. (1996)
- Cryptococcus cereanus Phaff et al. (1974)
- Cryptococcus consortionis Vishniac (1985)
- Cryptococcus decagattii F.Hagen & Boekhout (2015)
- Cryptococcus deneoformans F.Hagen & Boekhout (2015)
- Cryptococcus depauperatus (Petch) Boekhout, Xin Z. Liu, F.Y. Bai & M. Groenew. (2015)
- Cryptococcus deuterogattii F.Hagen & Boekhout (2015)
- Cryptococcus elinovii Golubev (1979)
- Cryptococcus ferigula Saëz & Rodr. Mir. (1988)
- Cryptococcus festucosus Golubev & J.P.Samp. (2004)
- Cryptococcus floricola Yurkov, A.R. Passer, M.A.Coelho, R.B.Billmyre, M.Nowrousian, Mittelbach, C.A.Cuomo, A.F.Averette, S.Sun & Heitman (2019)
- Cryptococcus gattii (Vanbreus. & Takashio) Kwon-Chung & Boekhout (2002)
- Cryptococcus hempflingii Vishniac & Baharaeen (1982)
- Cryptococcus heveanensis (Groen.) Baptist & Kurtzman (1977)
- Cryptococcus himalayensis Goto & Sugiy. (1970)
- Cryptococcus hominis Vuill. ex Guég. (1907)
- Cryptococcus lactativorus Fell & Phaff (1967)
- Cryptococcus longus M.Takash., Sugita, Shinoda & Nakase (2001)
- Cryptococcus lupi Baharaeen & Vishniac (1982)
- Cryptococcus luteus (P.Roberts) Boekhout, Xin Zhan Liu, F.Y.Bai & M.Groenew. (2015)
- Cryptococcus montanae Weijman, Rodr. Mir. & Van der Walt (1988)
- Cryptococcus musci M. Takash., Sugita, Shinoda & Nakase (2001)
- Cryptococcus mycelialis Golubev & N.W.Golubev (2003)
- Cryptococcus neoformans (San Felice) Vuill. (1901)
- Cryptococcus nyarrowii Thomas-Hall & K.Watson (2002)
- Cryptococcus pseudolongus M.Takash., Sugita, Shinoda & Nakase (2001)
- Cryptococcus ramirezgomezianus M.Takash., Sugita, Shinoda & Nakase (2001)
- Cryptococcus saitoi Á.Fonseca, Scorzetti & Fell (2002)
- Cryptococcus socialis Vishniac (1985)
- Cryptococcus tetragattii F.Hagen & Boekhout (2015)
- Cryptococcus tyrolensis Vishniac & Baharaeen (1982)
- Cryptococcus uniguttulatus (Wolfram & Zach) Phaff & Fell (1970)
- Cryptococcus watticus Guffogg, Thomas-Hall, P.Holloway & K.Watson (2004)
- Cryptococcus wingfieldii (Van der Walt, Y.Yamada & N.P.Ferreira) Yurkov, A.R. Passer, M.A.Coelho, R.B.Billmyre, M.Nowrousian, Mittelbach, C.A.Cuomo, A.F.Averette, S.Sun & Heitman (2019)
- Cryptococcus wrightensis Vishniac & Baharaeen (1982)

== Epidemiology ==
Cryptococcus neoformans and Cryptococcus gattii are fungal organisms found worldwide. Notably, the sub-Saharan African region has the highest burden of disease. Individuals within the region often become significantly ill, often resulting in death. These organisms are known to target those individuals with HIV and AIDS. Cryptococcal meningitis is also known to target patients with HIV/AIDS disease. Cryptococcal meningitis has been found to cause approximately 15% of AIDS-related deaths worldwide, especially in low- and middle-income regions. The cases of cryptococcal meningitis deaths in higher-income countries have declined due to the implementation of antiretroviral drug therapy. Though higher-income regions do have cases of cryptococcal meningitis AIDS-related deaths, they are most associated with immunocompromised patients. Cryptococcus gattii is another organism within this family and has typically been associated with tropical and subtropical regions; however, it is now being seen in more temperate regions and in parts of North America. This shift emphasizes its changing distribution and geographic range.

== Environmental reservoirs and One Health significance ==
Cryptococcus species are commonly found within the environment in sources such as soil, decaying organic matter, and bird droppings, with pigeon droppings being the most significant. Unlike many infectious diseases, Cryptococcus transmission relies heavily on environmental sources as its primary route of infection. Fungal particles can cause infection when airborne and inhaled by humans. The transmission via inhaled particles highlights the importance of environmental awareness and prevention strategies, especially for immunocompromised individuals. The One Health perspective should be considered when assessing the transmission and ecology of Cryptococcus species. Factors such as urban development, climate conditions, and changes in land use have affected the distribution of Cryptococcus. The One Health approach addresses understanding the environmental impacts and drivers of infection, ultimately helping improve the global burden of disease and predict disease patterns.
