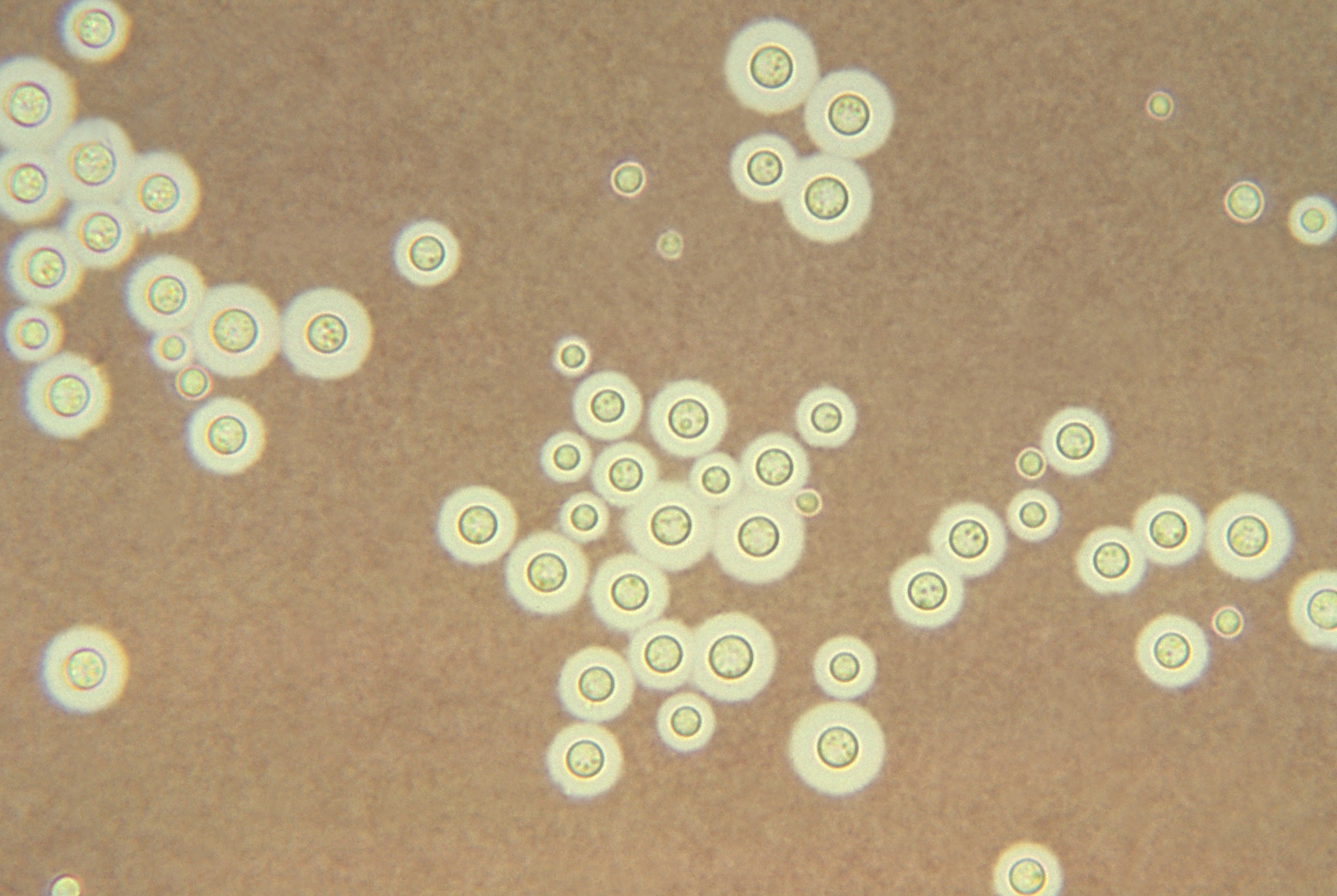
- Yeast state of Cryptococcus neoformans

Scientific classification
- Kingdom: Fungi
- Division: Basidiomycota
- Class: Tremellomycetes
- Order: Tremellales
- Family: Cryptococcaceae; Kütz. ex Castell. & Chalm. (1919)

Genera
- Cryptococcus; Kwoniella

= Cryptococcaceae =

Genus of fungi

The Cryptococcaceae (from Ancient Greek κρυπτός (kruptós), meaning "hidden", and κόκκος (kókkos), meaning "grain") are a family of fungi in the order Tremellales. The family currently contains two genera. Some species produce filamentous, sexual states with distinctive basidia and are parasites of other fungi. Most, however, are only known from their yeast states. Several species of Cryptococcus are human pathogens.
