= Myriodontium keratinophilum =

Scientific classification
- Kingdom: Fungi
- Division: Ascomycota
- Class: Eurotiomycetes
- Order: Onygenales
- Family: Onygenaceae
- Genus: Apinisia
- Species: A. keratinophila

Binomial name
- Apinisia keratinophila (Samson & Polon.) Meng Li & L.Cai (2023)

Synonyms
- Myriodontium keratinophilum Samson & Polon. (1978); Apinisia keratinophilum (Samson & Polon.) Meng Li & L. Cai (2023)

Species of fungus

Apinisia keratinophila, formerly Myriodontium keratinophilum, is a fungus widespread in nature, most abundantly found in keratin-rich environments such as feathers, nails and hair. Despite its ability to colonize keratinous surfaces of human body, the species has been known to be non-pathogenic in man and is phylogentically distant to other human pathogenic species, such as anthropophilic dermatophytes (e.g., Trichophyton rubrum, Trichophyton interdigitale). However, its occasional isolation from clinical specimens along with its keratinolytic properties suggest the possibility it may contribute to disease.

== History and taxonomy ==
Apinisia keratinophila was first isolated in Italy in 1978, during the screening of soil microbes for their ability to produce antibiotic and antiviral substances. The fungus was described by Luciano Polonelli and Robert A. Samson, and was classified into a separate taxon for its ability to produce multiple asexual spores (conidia) at different points across the surface of the hypha. Later in 1997, its asexual state (teleomorph) was independently described and named as Neoarachnotheca keratinophilia by Josef Cano and Krzysztof Ulfig. M. keratinophilum is the only member of the genus Myriodontium.

== Growth and morphology ==
The vegetative and fertile hyphae are branched, hyaline, septate, smooth-walled, and ranges from 2.5 μm to 6 μm in width. The sexual fruiting structure (gymnothecium) consists of loosely interwoven hyphae that are hyaline to yellow in colour, and typically matures within a month, attaining a diameter of 150–700 μm. The gymnothecium encloses millions of round, hyaline asci that each bear 8 ascospores. The defining feature of A. keratinophila is that its ascospores are randomly wrinkled and pitted with an irregular sheath. The (conidia) are one-celled and emerge at multiple different points across the surface of fertile hyphae. Species of the genera Chromelosporium and Pulchromyces morphologically resemble Myriodontium.

== Physiology ==
Apinisia keratinophila exhibits keratinolytic properties, and it is able to grow on and degrade keratinous surfaces such as feathers. The fungus shows moderate to rapid growth on YpSs agar, attaining a diameter of 6 cm in 14 days at 25 °C (77 °F); the colonies are white with a felt base obscured by floccose mycelium. On hay-infusion agar, the growth rate is slightly reduced with a diameter of 5 cm in 14 days at 25 °C (77 °F). Similar growth rate is exhibited on oatmeal agar. On phytone extract agar at 25 °C (77 °F), its colony shows faster growth relative to other medium, spreading up to 2.7 mm per day. On potato dextrose agar at 25 °C (77 °F), it exhibits a mean daily spread of 1.8–2.3 mm. On Sabouraud agar at 25 °C (77 °F), the mean daily spread is slightly reduced, ranging from 1.4–2.0 mm. It shows no growth at 37 °C (99 °F).

== Habitat and ecology ==
Apinisia keratinophila is commonly found in soils and river sediments. M. keratinophilum has been isolated from many different keratinous materials, such as the penis of a bull, hair of shrews and cats, and feathers of pigeons. The fungus also inhabits human hairs as an ectothrix that do not penetrate the cortex.

=== Isolation from human clinical specimens ===
Due to its uncertain pathogenic potential, A. keratinophila is classified as safe to be handled with Biosafety Level 1-equivalent containment. However, in 1985, a case of frontal sinusitis from a Nigerian patient reports its isolation from the mucosal tissue lining of the sinus. Considering the elevation in the levels of plasma cells and eosiophils, M. keratinophilum was determined to be the causal agent and the patient was treated with ketoconazole. The morpholocial features of the species isolated were described to be similar to those that cause allergic aspergillosis of paranasal sinuses, such as Aspergillus flavus and Aspergillus niger. However, it has been proposed that this case may have been misdiagnosed in confusion with Schizophyllum commune. M. keratinophilum is also regularly isolated from dermatophytic and psoriatic lesions infected by non-dermatophytes, and is identified as one of the agents of hyalohyphomycosis. A report of spectrum analysis of patients with fungal infection also documents its isolation from nails of patients.

=== Isolation from other clinical materials ===
A. keratinophila is identified to be entomopatheogenic and causes mycosis and mortality in oak lace bug (Corythucha arcuata) when exposed to conidia. Its isolates have also been found on mole cricket nymphs (Gryllotalpa gryllotalpa), and conidial application of A. keratinophila induced significant mortality and mycosis.
