= Hair perforation test =

The hair perforation test, also known as an in vitro hair perforation test, is a laboratory test used to help distinguish the isolates of dermatophytes, such as Trichophyton mentagrophytes and its variants. The test is performed by placing an organism into a Petri dish containing water, yeast extract, and hair. After incubation for 4 week, they are examined under microscopy T.mentagrophyte would have produced erosions on the Hair while T. Rubrum will not produce any change. Hence they are used to differtiate dermatophytes. The Mayo Clinic's mycology laboratory has identified five common dermatophytes; Microsporum gypseum, Microsporum canis, Trichophyton rubrum, Trichophyton mentagrophytes, and Trichophyton tonsurans.
