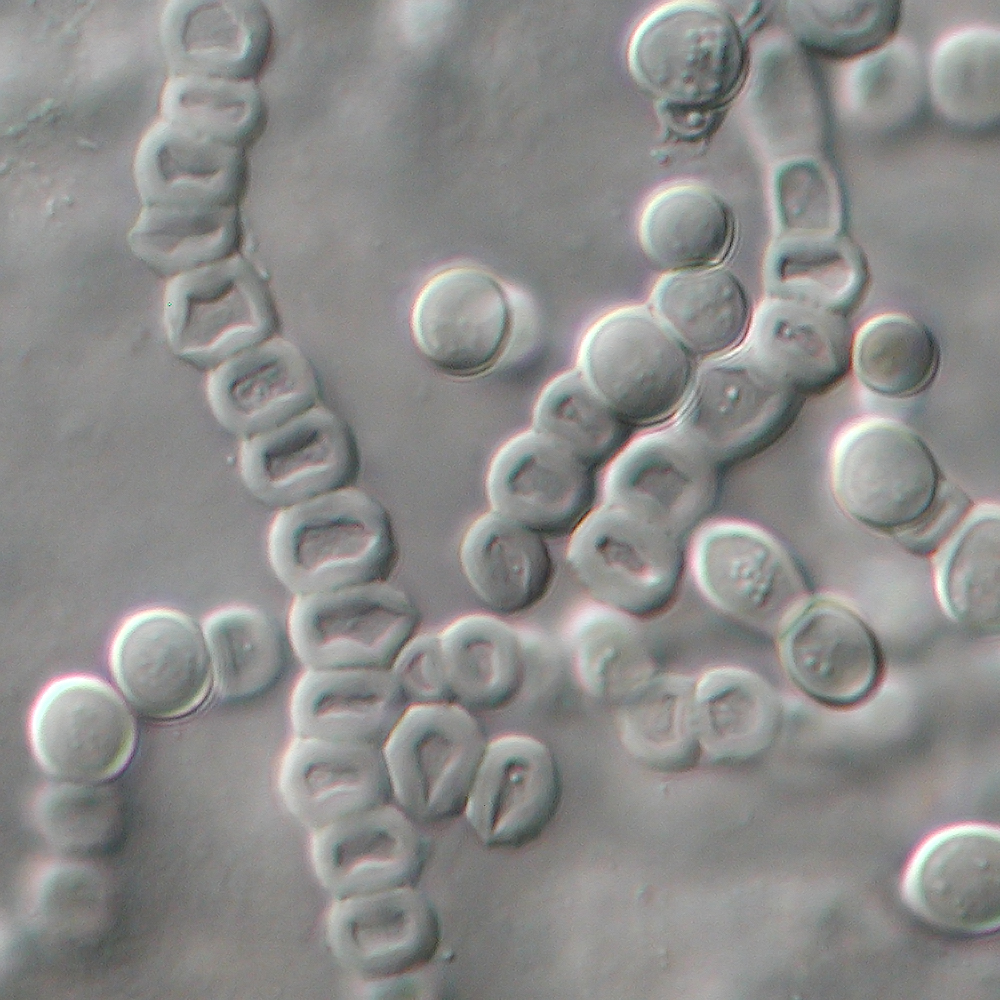
- Chlamydospores of T. verrucosum growing in chains at 37 C

Scientific classification
- Kingdom: Fungi
- Division: Ascomycota
- Class: Eurotiomycetes
- Order: Onygenales
- Family: Arthrodermataceae
- Genus: Trichophyton
- Species: T. verrucosum

Binomial name
- Trichophyton verrucosum E. Bodin (1902)

Synonyms
- Ectotrichophyton verrucosum Castell. & Chalm. (1919); Favotrichophyton verrucosum Neveu-Lem. (1921); Trichophyton album Sabour (1908); Trichophyton ochraceum Sabour (1908); Trichophyton discoides Sabour (1910)

= Trichophyton verrucosum =

Species of fungus

Trichophyton verrucosum, commonly known as the cattle ringworm fungus, is a dermatophyte largely responsible for fungal skin disease in cattle, but is also a common cause of ringworm in donkeys, dogs, goat, sheep, and horses. It has a worldwide distribution, however human infection is more common in rural areas where contact with animals is more frequent, and can cause severe inflammation of the afflicted region. Trichophyton verrucosum was first described by Emile Bodin in 1902.

== Growth and morphology ==
Trichophyton verrucosum is very slow-growing compared to other dermatophytes. In culture, it is characterized by being flat, white/cream colour, having an occasional dome, with a glabrous texture, known as the variant album, however other variations are also found: T. verrucosum var. ochraceum has a flat, yellow, glabrous colony; T. verrucosum var. discoides has a gray-white, flat, and tomentose colony; and T. verrucosum var. autotrophicum is rarely seen and is associated with sheep. Under a microscope, macronidia are rare, and have a rat-tail or string bean shape, while micronidia are tear-shaped and have been only observed in laboratories when grown under enriched conditions. It lacks a teleomorph (sexual) stage. At 37 °C (the only dermatophyte with an optimum growth temperature this high), chlamydospores become thick-walled and found in long chains. Macronidia are more commonly produced on BCP-milk solids-yeast extract agar, and only on colonies over 7 days old. Under refrigeration, it will die. Regions infected with T. verrucosum will fluoresce under a blacklight in cattle, but not in humans.

== Epidemiology and pathology ==
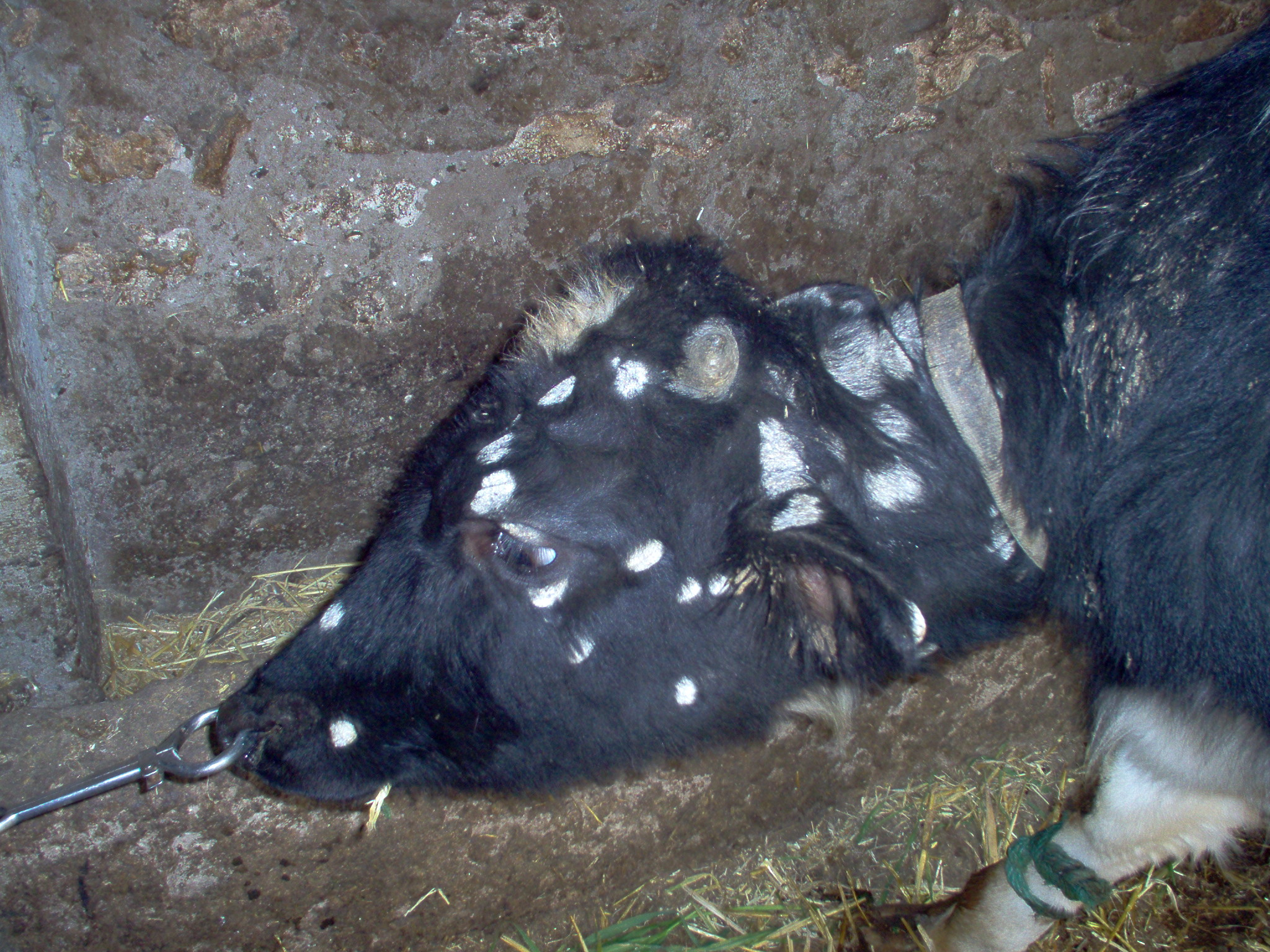
Cow showing characteristic hairless lesions associated with T. verrucosum.

=== Infections in cattle ===
Trichophyton verrucosum is thought to have evolved from a soil-dwelling ancestor that migrated to its contemporary cattle host, losing many features that it previously required for survival in soil habitats through genetic drift, including vitamin prototrophy, urease activity, and the ability to perforate hair. Infection is characterized by 10–50 mm patches of hair loss, desquamation, and formation of thick crusts. Trichophyton verrucosum is endemic in cattle, and almost exclusively the fungus that is isolated from cattle with ringworm, with younger cattle being more prone to infection due to their skin having higher pH, and having weaker immune systems.

The disease is important economically, as it can spoil milk, meat, and leather quality of cattle. Infection in cattle peaks in fall and winter in overcrowded and cramped cattle-housing. Transmission can occur directly through contact between sick and healthy animals, and indirectly through fomites that can be viable for up to 4 years. Rearing cattle together with other ruminants, such as sheep, may increase prevalence of infection due to ruminants being able to roam free, spreading the infection. One study in Italy of 20 farms and 294 cattle found all farms contained infected cattle, with prevalence within farms ranging between 25-100%. In contrast, immunization has eradicated T. verrucosum from herds in Eastern Germany and by 2012 only two herds in Norway were affected. The LTF-130 vaccine was developed in the early 1970s by a team led by Lyubov Yablochnik and A. K. Sarkisov at the All-Russian Scientific Research Institute of Experimental Veterinary Medicine.

=== Infections in humans ===
While distribution is worldwide, T. verrucosum and other zoophilic dermatophytes are the most frequently isolated fungi from skin lesions in Southern Europe and the Middle East (T. rubrum, a dermatophyte that more commonly infects humans, is the most prevalent in other regions). Infection to humans is largely zoonotic, and can be transmitted through direct contact or bites, but there have also been recorded cases of laboratory acquired infection, and needlestick injury during vaccination. Contact with horse blankets and cattle posts can also cause infection, and T. verrucosum has also been isolated from flies, although it is unknown whether flies can serve as vectors of transmission. The majority of infections are occupational, and this includes agricultural workers, veterinarians, stockyard workers, and grain handlers (infection can also be transmitted human-to-human, thus family members of these workers are also at risk). Infection of the hair is ectothrix, and can cause tinea capitis (with potential for kerions and irreversible scarring and alopecia), as well as tinea corporis, tinea manuum, tinea barbae, and tinea profunda. It is the most common cause of tinea barbae in man. A vaccine exists for both cattle and humans, and combined with hygienic practices has led to a decline in cases. It has also been observed that recurrent infections do not occur. Treatment can include oral terbinafine, fluconazole, or griseofulvin; topical treatment is also possible, however it requires more time and may have lower rates of compliance, proving to be less effective.

== Isolation and identification ==
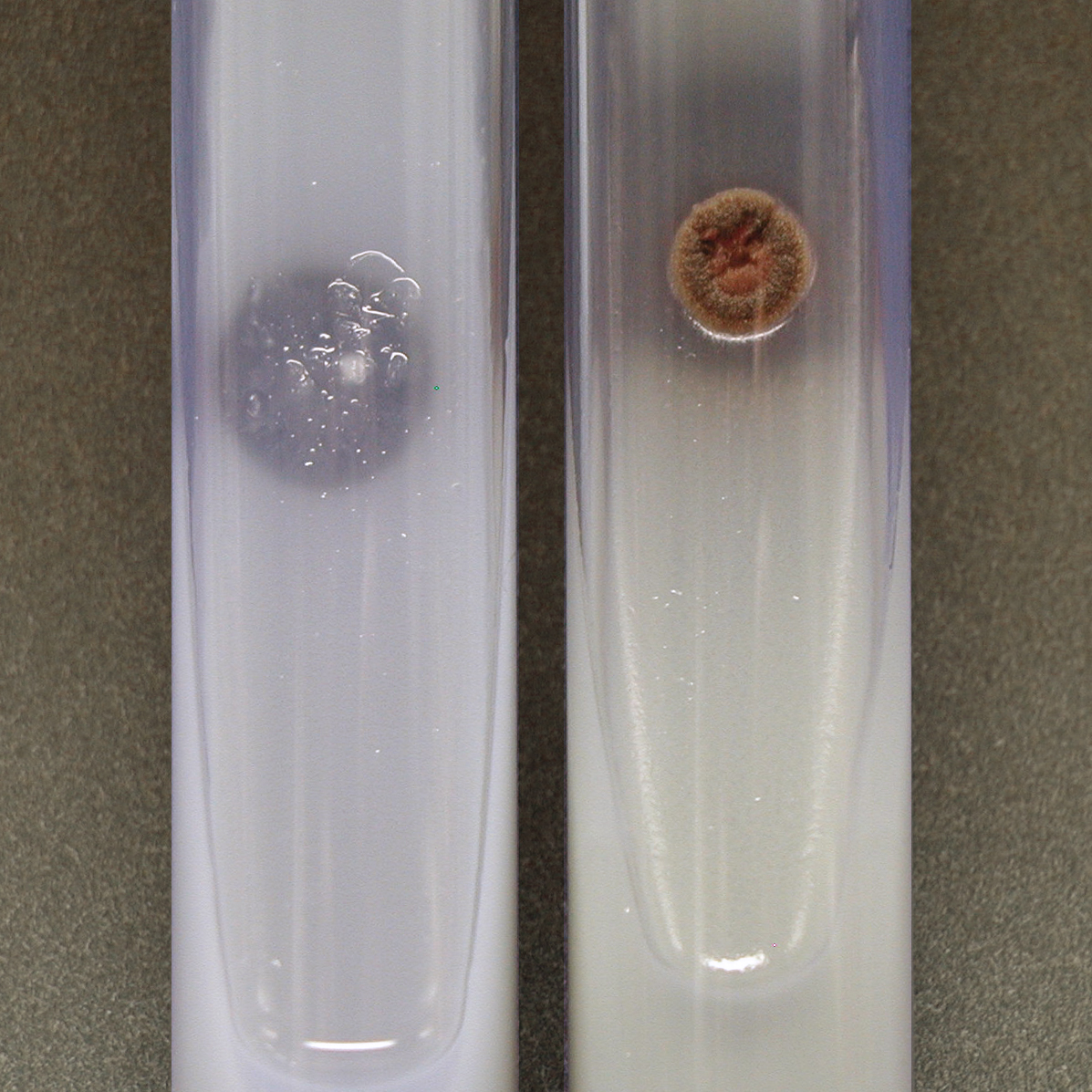
Trichophyton verrucosum (L) and T. violaceum (R) grown for 7 d on Bromocresol purple milk solids glucose agar at 37 C.

In preparing samples for diagnosis, a scraping of the skin from the active border of infection is taken, and is inoculated directly onto the test medium. Trichophyton verrucosum is auxotrophic for inositol and thiamine, and as such can be distinguished from other dermatophytes by observing strong growth on Trichophyton agar 3 (a medium rich in thiamine and inositol) and none to weak growth on Trichophyton agars 1 and 2 (deficient in these nutrients). It will also grow on Sabouraud agar, but only with the addition of yeast extract (which provides the inositol and thiamine it requires). In Bromocresol purple (BCP) milk solids glucose agar, a medium used to distinguish the dermatophytes from bacteria and other organisms by evaluating ammonium production during proteolysis, T. verrucosum produces a weakly alkaline result (faint purple) and clearing of milk solids with a characteristic halo on the periphery. Negative test results occur for the urease test, hair perforation test, and casamino acids erythritol albumin agar. In conjunction to physiological tests, contact with cattle should also be used as a criterion due to the zoophilic and occupational nature of the disease. Otherwise, misdiagnosis as pyoderma or bacterial folliculitis can occur, with the prescribed antibacterial treatment having no effect. Indeed, one study found that people infected with T. verrucosum had to visit a physician on average of 2.5 times, with 25 days elapsing, before a proper diagnosis was obtained. This may lead to an underestimation of the true number of cases, as many people will recover from the disease before obtaining a proper diagnosis. Looking at the stratum corneum under a microscope may also aid in diagnosis, which is done by adding 10% KOH solution and a Periodic acid-Schiff stain. Swollen chlamydospores 5-10 μm in diameter will appear outside the hair shaft, while skin samples will have swollen spores mixed with dermatophyte filaments.
