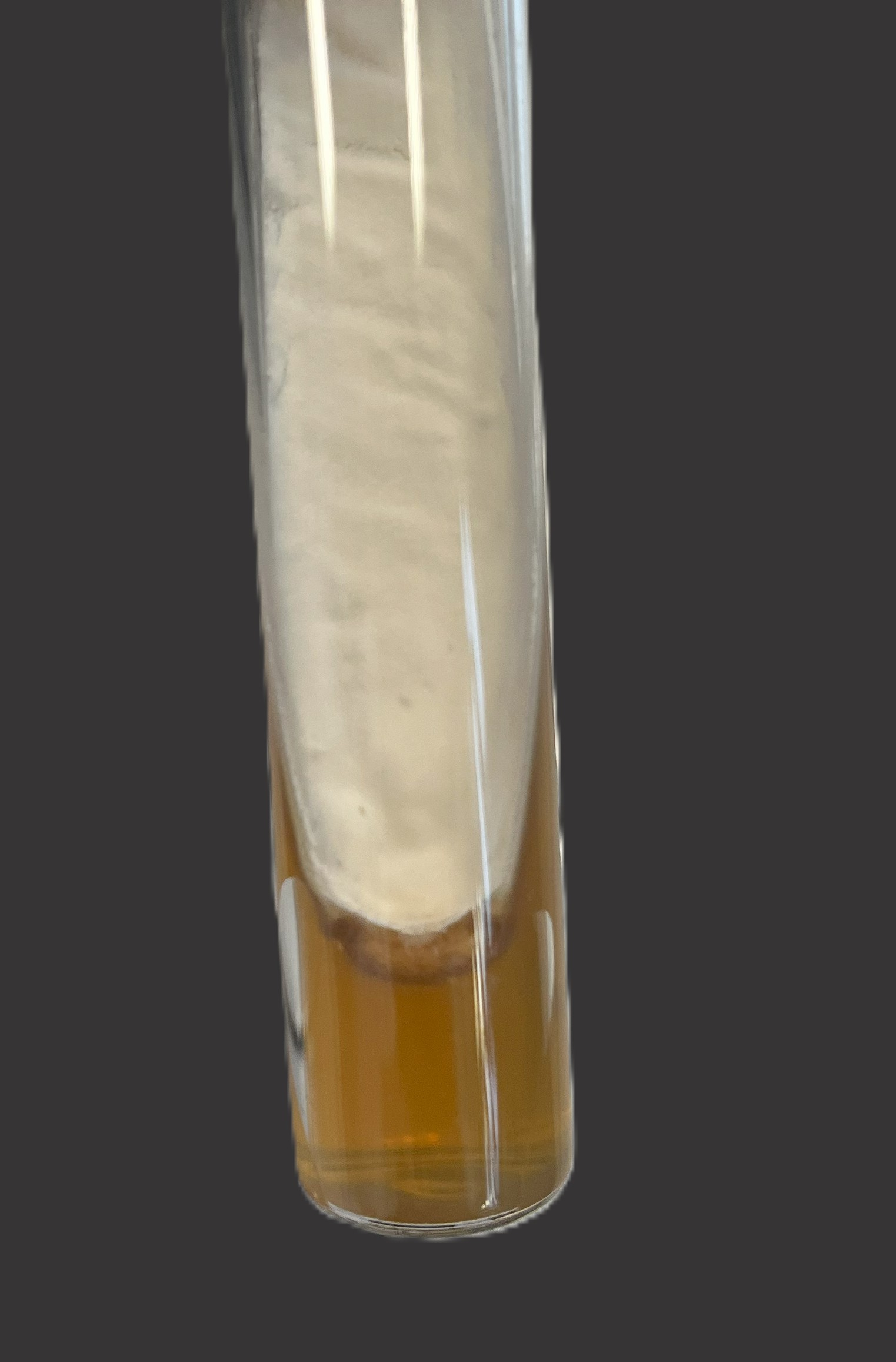
- Culture of Trichophyton indotineae on Sabouraud agar in a tube (front above, and back, below).
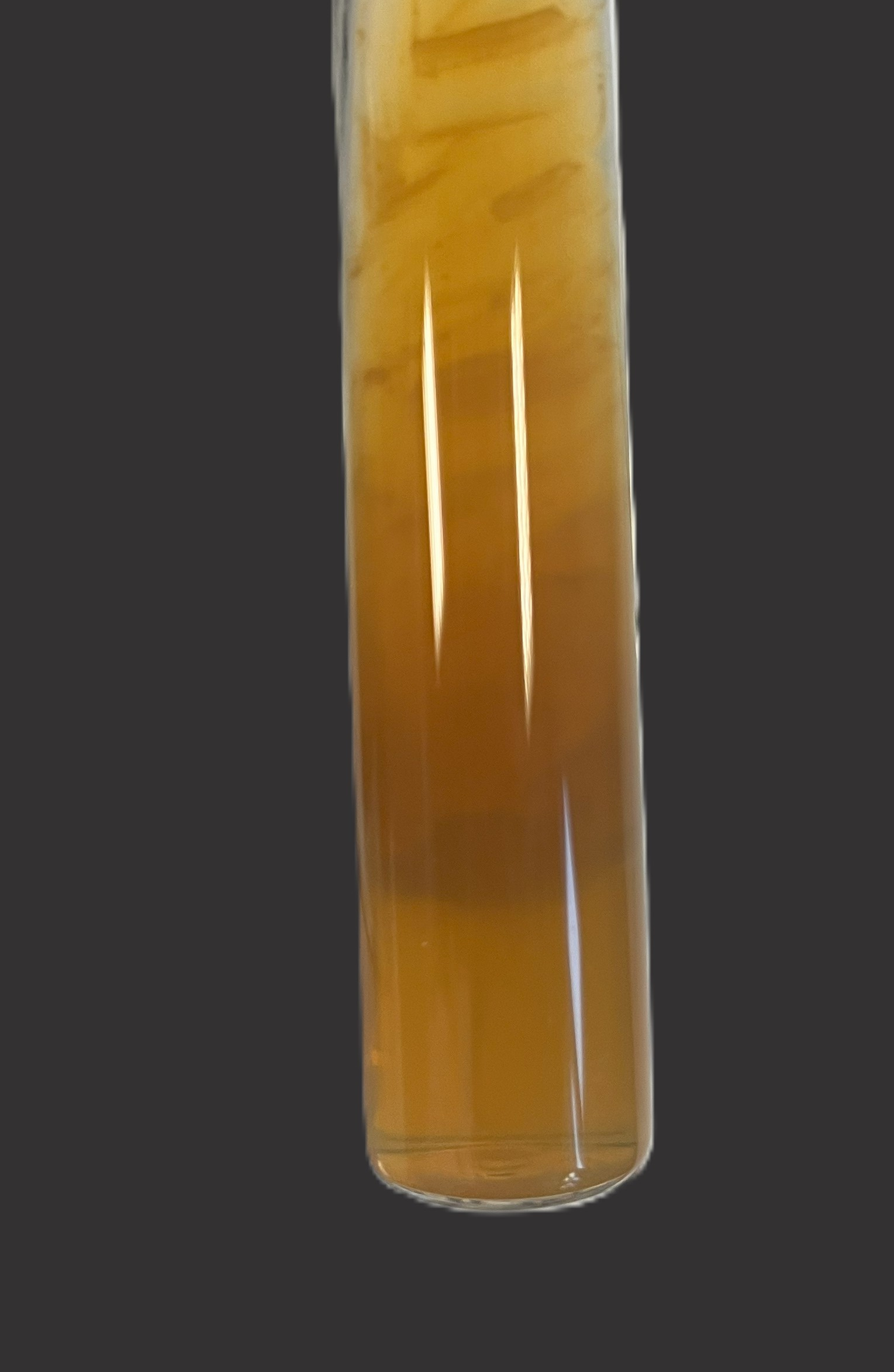

Scientific classification
- Kingdom: Fungi
- Division: Ascomycota
- Class: Eurotiomycetes
- Order: Onygenales
- Family: Arthrodermataceae
- Genus: Trichophyton
- Species: T. indotineae

Binomial name
- Trichophyton indotineae R. Kano, U. Kimura, M. Kakurai, J. Hiruma, H. Kamata, Y. Suga & K. Harada

= Trichophyton indotineae =

Species of fungus

Trichophyton indotineae is a recently identified fungus species within the Trichophyton genus, known for causing dermatophytosis—a fungal infection of the skin. First emerging in South Asia over the past decade, T. indotineae has been associated with widespread outbreaks of severe, treatment-resistant, and frequently relapsing skin infections among otherwise healthy individuals.

== Taxonomy and identification ==
Originally classified as Trichophyton mentagrophytes genotype VIII, molecular studies have since distinguished T. indotineae as a separate species within the T. mentagrophytes complex.

The macroscopic appearance of Trichophyton indotineae colonies is similar to that of Trichophyton mentagrophytes. The colonies exhibit a white, powdery surface with a reverse side that ranges in color from white to brown. Microscopy is characterized by the presence of small and large round and oval microconidia, septate spindle-shaped macroconidia, and spiral hyphae. Neither the macroscopic nor the microscopic appearance allows differentiation between Trichophyton indotineae and Trichophyton mentagrophytes.

== Clinical manifestations ==
Infections caused by T. indotineae often present as inflammatory and intensely itchy dermatophytosis, affecting areas such as the groin, buttocks, trunk, and face. Lesions are typically extensive and pruritic, leading to significant discomfort.

== Antifungal resistance ==
A notable characteristic of T. indotineae is its reduced susceptibility to common antifungal treatments, particularly terbinafine, which has traditionally been a first-line oral therapy for dermatophyte infections. However, this resistance is not observed in all strains; some studies have reported up to 85% of isolates exhibiting resistance. This decreased efficacy is often associated with mutations in the squalene epoxidase gene.

Alternative treatments, such as itraconazole administered at high dose for several weeks, have shown efficacy. Voriconazole has also been effective, while fluconazole is generally ineffective. Topical treatments alone are often insufficient but may be beneficial when combined with systemic therapy.

== Global spread ==
While initially prevalent in South Asia, cases of T. indotineae infections have been reported globally, including in North America and Europe. The global spread is concerning, especially given the challenges associated with treatment-resistant strains.
