= Trichophyton concentricum =

Scientific classification
- Kingdom: Fungi
- Division: Ascomycota
- Class: Eurotiomycetes
- Order: Onygenales
- Family: Arthrodermataceae
- Genus: Trichophyton
- Species: T. concentricum

Binomial name
- Trichophyton concentricum R. Blanch (1896)

Synonyms
- Achorion concentricum Guiart & Grigoraki (1928); Aspergillus concentricum Castell (1907); Endodermophyton concentricum M. Ota & Langeron (1923); Lepidophyton concentricum Gedoelst (1902); Mycoderma concentricum Vuill (1929); Oospora concentrica Hanawa and Nagai (1917)

Species of fungus

Trichophyton concentricum is an anthropophilic dermatophyte believed to be an etiological agent of a type of skin mycosis in humans, evidenced by scaly cutaneous patches on the body known as tinea imbricata. This fungus has been found mainly in the Pacific Islands and South America.

== Growth and morphology ==
Trichophyton concentricum produce dense, slow-growing folded colonies which are mostly white to cream colored on Sabouraud's dextrose agar and their hyphae are normally branched, irregular and septate with antler tips resembling T. schoenleinii. The production of conidia is unusual, however when present, microconidia and macroconidia are smooth walled with a diameter of approximately 4 microns and 50 μm respectively. Due to its resemblance to macroconidia, hyphae are sometimes falsely identified as macroconidia. These fungi are also considered to be osmotolerant because of their ability to grow small colonies on 5% NaCl media. Hair perforation assays are generally negative with T. concentricum and growth is poor at 37 °C. While T. concentricum is considered to be independent of external vitamin sources, growth is more robust with thiamine supplementation. This characteristic feature is commonly used to distinguish between T. concentricum and T. schoeleinii. Overall, the natural habitat and growth of T. concentricum is not well understood and further studies are required.

== Reproduction ==
Trichophyton concentricum reproduces sexually via its ascospores which are produced internally in vacuoles called asci (sing. ascus), found in pouches known as ascomata (sing. ascoma). The asexual form of T. concentricum is composed of irregularly arranged filaments with chlamydoconidia and microaleurioconidia.

== Pathology and treatment ==
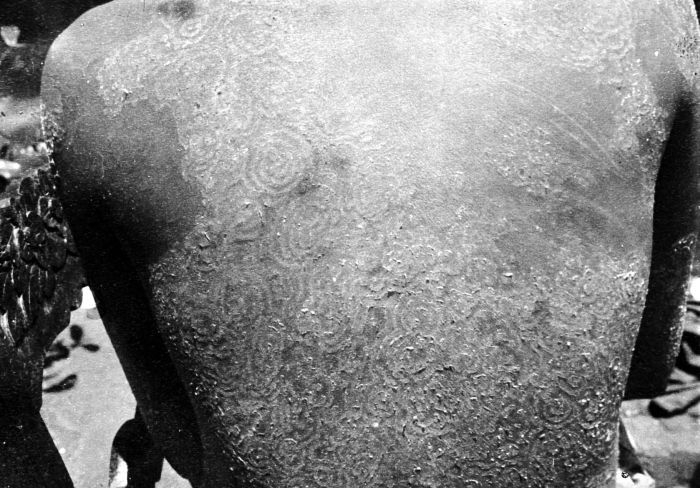
Imbricated lesions of T. concentricum on the back of an Indonesian patient.

Trichophyton concentricum is an anthropophilic dermatophyte, meaning, humans are its primary host. Disease may result from close contact with the spores and filaments of T.concentricum or contact and sharing of household items with an infected person since it is communicable. It is usually contracted during childhood and causes a non-inflammatory chronic tinea corporis known as tinea imbricata, otherwise known as Tokelau. This is characterized by concentric rings of overlapping scales called papulosquamous patches which may exist for an individual's lifetime. While these lesions appears to affect mostly the trunk region of the body, it may affect any other area. There has been rare occurrences where the nails, skin and palms are affected but it has not been known to invade hair. Most lesions begin on the face and subsequently spread to larger areas of the body. Pruritus has been the most common symptom of infection and it is most severe in warm and humid climates. Tinea imbricata has been known to cause hypopigmentation and hyperpigmentation. Susceptibility to this infection has been reported to be hereditary with both dominant and recessive inheritance patterns. Environmental and immunological factors have also been implicated as playing a role in susceptibility to this fungus. Tinea imbricata can co-exist with other maladies and this may result in varied clinical presentations.

Scrapings from lesions can be stained with 10% potassium hydroxide for visualization under microscope. The medium Sabouraud's dextrose agar is commonly used for colony growth and is treated with antibiotics to prevent bacterial contamination. Colonies growth is usually observed in 1–2 weeks at 25 °C. Identification using polymerase chain reaction is also possible, this provides an accurate rapid diagnosis.

Treatment of tinea imbricata is usually with griseofulvin combined with a topical imidazole agent which is administered until cured. Treatment with griseofulvin or terbinafine has also been successful when combined with a keratinolytic agent, such as a topical cream. Griseofulvin which is administered orally, serves to disrupt fungal mitosis, hence prevents the division and spread of fungal cells. Compared to griseofulvin, azole and allylamine agents have not been found to be as effective in treating tinea imbricata. However, griseofulvin has not shown to be effective as a prophylactic agent to prevent tinea imbricata. The eradication of T.concentricum is believed to be difficult due to high recurrence and presence in remote rural areas.

== Epidemiology ==
Trichophyton concentricum is endemic to the Pacific Islands and southeast Asia, particularly in the indigenous hill tribe people. 9-18% of individuals in these regions are affected. Cases of T. concentricum infection among the South and Central American indigenous people has also been reported. Infections among Europeans are rare. The vast range of climates in the endemic regions has led to speculations about the existence of two strains: a thermotolerant strain which lives between 28 and 30 degrees Celsius and a thermo-sensitive strain which lives between 20 and 25 degrees Celsius. However, no evidence has been found to support this theory.

Tinea imbricata has been found in equal proportions in males and females and distributed equally among all age groups. The disease affects mostly individuals with particular genetic ancestry; and lack of proper hygienic conditions have been shown to increase risk of infection. Additionally, dietary conditions, hygiene, environment, immune considerations, and genetics are factors believed to play a role in susceptibility.
