= Tokelau (disambiguation) =

Tokelau is a dependent territory of New Zealand. It may also refer to:

- Tinea imbricata, a superficial fungal infection also known as tokelau
- Tokelau, Tuvalu, a village on Nanumaga, Tuvalu
- Tui Tokelau, a god worshipped in Tokelau
