= Dermatophyte =

Common label for a group of three types of fungus

Dermatophyte (from Greek δέρμα derma "skin" (GEN δέρματος dermatos) and φυτόν phyton "plant") is a common label for a group of fungus of Arthrodermataceae that commonly causes skin disease in animals and humans. Traditionally, these anamorphic (asexual or imperfect fungi) mold genera are: Microsporum, Epidermophyton and Trichophyton. There are about 40 species in these three genera. Species capable of reproducing sexually belong in the teleomorphic genus Arthroderma, of the Ascomycota (see Teleomorph, anamorph and holomorph for more information on this type of fungal life cycle). As of 2019 a total of nine genera are identified and new phylogenetic taxonomy has been proposed.

Dermatophytes cause infections of the skin, hair, and nails, obtaining nutrients from keratinized material. The organisms colonize the keratin tissues causing inflammation as the host responds to metabolic byproducts. Colonies of dermatophytes are usually restricted to the nonliving cornified layer of the epidermis because of their inability to penetrate the viable tissue of an immunocompetent host. Invasion does elicit a host response ranging from mild to severe. Acid proteinases (proteases), elastase, keratinases, and other proteinases reportedly act as virulence factors. Additionally, the products of these degradative enzymes serve as nutrients for the fungi. The development of cell-mediated immunity correlated with delayed hypersensitivity and an inflammatory response is associated with clinical cure, whereas the lack of or defective cell-mediated immunity predisposes the host to chronic or recurrent dermatophyte infection.

Some of these skin infections are known as ringworm or tinea (which is the Latin word for "worm"), though infections are not caused by worms. It is thought that the word tinea (worm) is used to describe the snake-like appearance of the dermatophyte on the skin. Toenail and fingernail infections are referred to as onychomycosis. Dermatophytes usually do not invade living tissues, but colonize the outer layer of the skin. Occasionally the organisms do invade subcutaneous tissues, resulting in kerion development.

== Types of infections ==
Infections by dermatophytes affect the superficial skin, hair, and nails are named using "tinea" followed by the Latin term for the area that is affected. Manifestation of infection tends to involve erythema, induration, itching, and scaling. Dermatophytoses tend to occur in moist areas and skin folds. The degree of infection depends on the specific site of infection, the fungal species, and the host inflammatory response.

Although symptoms can be barely noticeable in some cases, dermatophytoses can produce "chronic progressive eruptions that last months or years, causing considerable discomfort and disfiguration." Dermatophytoses are generally painless and are not life-threatening.

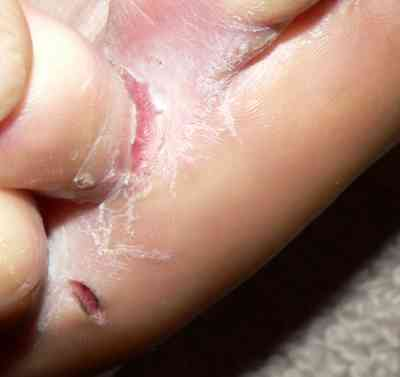
Tinea pedis also known as athletes foot.

=== Tinea pedis or athlete's foot ===
Contrary to the name, tinea pedis does not solely affect athletes. Tinea pedis affects men more than women, and is uncommon in children. Even in developed countries, tinea pedis is one of the most common superficial skin infections by fungi.

The infection can be seen between toes (interdigital pattern) and may spread to the sole of the foot in a "moccasin" pattern. In some cases, the infection may progress into a "vesiculobullous pattern" in which small, fluid-filled blisters are present. The lesions may be accompanied by peeling, maceration (peeling due to moisture), and itching.

Later stages of tinea pedis might include hyperkeratosis (thickened skin) of the soles, as well as bacterial infection (by streptococcus and staphylococcus) or cellulitis due to fissures developing between the toes.

Another implication of tinea pedis, especially for older adults or those with vascular disease, diabetes mellitus, or nail trauma, is onychomycosis of the toenails. Nails become thick, discolored, and brittle, and often onycholysis (painless separation of nail from nail bed) occurs.

=== Tinea cruris or jock itch ===
More commonly occurs in men than women. Tinea cruris may be exacerbated by sweat and tight clothing (hence the term "jock itch"). Frequently, the feet are also involved. The theory is that the feet get infected first from contact with the ground. The fungus spores are carried to the groin from scratching from putting on underclothing or pants. The infection frequently extends from the groin to the perianal skin and gluteal cleft.

The rashes appear red, scaly, and pustular, and is often accompanied by itch. Tinea cruris should be differentiated from other similar dermal conditions such as intertriginous candidiasis, erythrasma, and psoriasis.

=== Tinea corporis or ringworm of the body ===
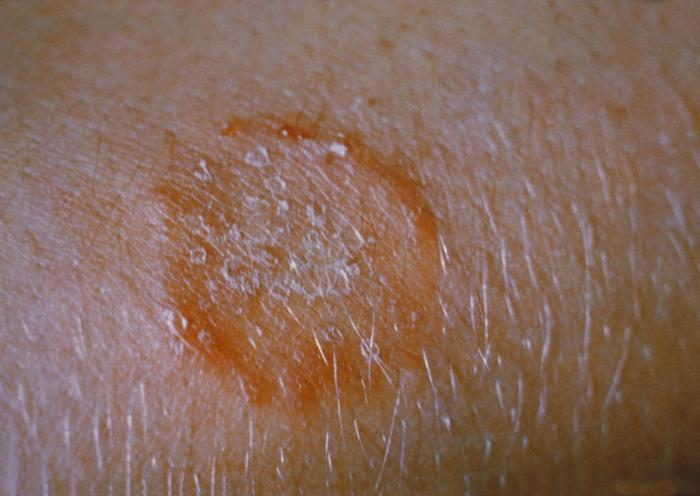
Tinea corporis of the arm with an active border and central clearing.

Lesions appear as round, red, scaly, patches with well-defined, raised edges, often with a central clearing and very itchy (usually on trunk, limbs, and also in other body parts). The lesions can be confused with contact dermatitis, eczema, and psoriasis.

=== Tinea faciei or facial ringworm ===
Round or ring shaped red patches may occur on non-bearded areas of the face. This type of dermatophytosis can have a subtle appearance, sometimes known as "tine incognito". It can be misdiagnosed for other conditions like psoriasis, discoid lupus, etc. and might be aggravated by treatment with immunosuppressive topical steroid creams.

=== Tinea capitis or scalp ("blackdot") ringworm ===
Children from ages 3–7 are most commonly infected with tinea capitis. Trichophyton tonsurans is the most common cause of out breaks of tinea capitis in children, and is the main cause of endothrix (inside hair) infections. Trichophyton rubrum is also a very common cause of favus, a form of tinea capitis in which crusts are seen on the scalp.

Tinea capitis is characterized by irregular or well-demarcated alopecia (balding) and scaling.

Infected hair shafts are broken off just at the base, leaving a black dot just under the surface of the skin, and alopecia can result. Scraping these residual black dot will yield the best diagnostic scrapings for microscopic exam. Numerous green arthrospores will be seen under the microscope inside the stubbles of broken hair shafts at 400×. Tinea capitis cannot be treated topically, and must be treated systemically with antifungals.

=== Tinea manuum or ringworm of the hands ===
In most cases of tinea manuum, only one hand is involved. Frequently both feet are involved concurrently, thus the saying "one hand, two feet".

=== Tinea incognita ===
Ringworm infections modified by corticosteroids, systemic or topical, prescribed for some pre-existing pathology or given mistakenly for the treatment of misdiagnosed tinea.

== Pathogenesis ==
In order for dermatophytoses to occur, the fungus must directly contact the skin. Likelihood of infection is increased if the skin integrity is compromised, as in minor breaks.

The fungi use various proteinases to establish infection in the keratinized stratum corneum. Some studies also suggest that a class of proteins called LysM coat the fungal cell walls to help the fungi evade host cell immune response.

The course of infection varies between each case, and may be determined by several factors including: "the anatomic location, the degree of skin moisture, the dynamics of skin growth and desquamation, the speed and extent of the inflammatory response, and the infecting species."

The ring shape of dermatophyte lesions result from outward growth of the fungi. The fungi spread in a centrifugal pattern in the stratum corneum, which is the outermost keratinized layer of the skin.

For nail infections, the growth initiates through the lateral or superficial nail plates, then continues throughout the nail. For hair infections, fungal invasion begins at the hair shaft.

Symptoms manifest from inflammatory reactions due to the fungal antigens. The rapid turnover of desquamation, or skin peeling, due to inflammation limits dermatophytoses, as the fungi are pushed out of the skin.

Dermatophytoses rarely cause serious illness, as the fungi infection tends to be limited to the superficial skin. The infection tends to self-resolve so long as the fungal growth does not exceed inflammatory response and desquamation rate is sufficient. If immune response is insufficient, however, infection may progress to chronic inflammation.

== Immune response ==
Fortunately, dermatophytoses soon progress from the inflammatory stage to spontaneous healing, which is largely cell-mediated. Fungi are destroyed via oxidative pathways by phagocytes both intracellularly and extracellularly. T-cell-mediated response using TH1 cells are likely responsible for controlling infection. It is unclear whether the antifungal antibodies formed in response to the infection play a role in immunity.

Infection may become chronic and widespread if the host has a compromised immune system and is receiving treatment that reduces T-lymphocyte function. Also, the responsible species for chronic infections in both normal and immunocompromised patients tends to be Trichophyton rubrum; immune response tends to be hyporeactive. However, "the clinical manifestations of these infections are largely due to delayed-type hypersensitivity responses to these agents rather than from direct effects of the fungus on the host."

== Diagnosis and identification ==
Usually, dermatophyte infections can be diagnosed by their appearance. However, a confirmatory rapid in-office test can also be conducted, which entails using a scalpel to scrape off a lesion sample from the nail, skin, or scalp and transferring it to a slide. Potassium hydroxide (KOH) is added to the slide and the sample is examined with a microscope to determine presence of hyphae. Care should be taken in procurement of a sample, as false-negative results may occur if the patient is already using an antifungal, if too small a sample is obtained, or if sample from a wrong site is collected.

Additionally, a Wood's lamp examination (ultraviolet light) may be used to diagnose specific dermatophytes that fluoresce. Should there be an outbreak or if a patient is not responding well to therapy, sometimes a fungal culture is indicated. A fungal culture is also used when long-term oral therapy is being considered.

Fungal culture medium can be used for positive identification of the species. The fungi tend to grow well at 25 degrees Celsius on Sabouraud agar within a few days to a few weeks. In the culture, characteristic septate hyphae can be seen interspersed among the epithelial cells, and the conidia may form either on the hyphae or on conidiophores. Trichophyton tonsurans, the causative agent of tinea capitis (scalp infection) can be seen as solidly packed arthrospores within the broken hairshafts scraped from the plugged black dots of the scalp. Microscopic morphology of the micro- and macroconidia is the most reliable identification character, but both good slide preparation and stimulation of sporulation in some strains are needed. While small microconidia may not always form, the larger macroconidia aids in identification of the fungal species.

Culture characteristics such as surface texture, topography and pigmentation are variable, so they are the least reliable criteria for identification. Clinical information such as the appearance of the lesion, site, geographic location, travel history, animal contacts and race is also important, especially in identifying rare non-sporulating species like Trichophyton concentricum, Microsporum audouinii and Trichophyton schoenleinii.

A special agar called Dermatophyte Test Medium (DTM) has been formulated to grow and identify dermatophytes. Without having to look at the colony, the hyphae, or macroconidia, one can identify the dermatophyte by a simple color test. The specimen (scraping from skin, nail, or hair) is embedded in the DTM culture medium. It is incubated at room temperature for 10 to 14 days. If the fungus is a dermatophyte, the medium will turn bright red. If the fungus is not a dermatophyte, no color change will be noted. If kept beyond 14 days, false positive can result even with non-dermatophytes. Specimen from the DTM can be sent for species identification if desired.

Often dermatophyte infection may resemble other inflammatory skin disorders or dermatitis, thus leading to misdiagnosis of fungal infections.

== Transmission ==
Dermatophytes are transmitted by direct contact with an infected host (human or animal) or by direct or indirect contact with infected shed skin or hair in fomites such as clothing, combs, hair brushes, theatre seats, caps, furniture, bed linens, shoes, socks, towels, hotel rugs, sauna, bathhouse, and locker room floors. Also, transmission may occur from soil-to-skin contact. Depending on the species the organism may be viable in the environment for up to 15 months.

While even healthy individuals may become infected, there is an increased susceptibility to infection when there is a preexisting injury to the skin such as scars, burns, excessive temperature and humidity. Adaptation to growth on humans by most geophilic species resulted in diminished loss of sporulation, sexuality, and other soil-associated characteristics.

== Classification ==
Dermatophytes are classified as anthropophilic (humans), zoophilic (animals) or geophilic (soil) according to their normal habitat.

- Anthropophilic dermatophytes are restricted to human hosts and produce a mild, chronic inflammation.
- Zoophilic organisms are found primarily in animals and cause marked inflammatory reactions in humans who have contact with infected cats, dogs, cattle, horses, birds, or other animals. Infection may also be transmitted via indirect contact with infected animals, such as by their hair. This is followed by a rapid termination of the infection.
- Geophilic species are usually recovered from the soil but occasionally infect humans and animals. They cause a marked inflammatory reaction, which limits the spread of the infection and may lead to a spontaneous cure but may also leave scars.

=== Sexual reproduction ===
Dermatophytes reproduce sexually by either of two modes, heterothallism or homothallism. In heterothallic species, interaction of two individuals with compatible mating types are required in order for sexual reproduction to occur. In contrast, homothallic fungi are self-fertile and can complete a sexual cycle without a partner of opposite mating type. Both types of sexual reproduction involve meiosis.

== Frequency of species ==
In North America and Europe, the nine most common dermatophyte species are:

- Trichophyton: rubrum, tonsurans, mentagrophytes, verrucosum, and schoenlenii
- Microsporum: canis, audouinii, and gypseum
- Epidermophyton: floccosum
- About 76% of the dermatophyte species isolated from humans are Trichophyton rubrum.
- 27% are Trichophyton mentagrophytes
- 7% are Trichophyton verrucosum
- 3% are Trichophyton tonsurans
- Infrequently isolated (less than 1%) are Epidermophyton floccosum, Microsporum audouinii, Microsporum canis, Microsporum equinum, Microsporum nanum, Microsporum versicolor, Trichophyton equinum, Trichophyton kanei, Trichophyton raubitschekii, and Trichophyton violaceum.

The mixture of species is quite different in domesticated animals and pets (see ringworm for details).

== Epidemiology ==
Since dermatophytes are found worldwide, infections by these fungi are extremely common.

Infections occur more in males than in females, as the predominantly female hormone, progesterone, inhibits the growth of dermatophyte fungi.

== Medications ==
General medications for dermatophyte infections include topical ointments.

- Topical medications like clotrimazole, butenafine, miconazole, and terbinafine.
- Systemic medications (oral) like fluconazole, griseofulvin, terbinafine, and itraconazole.

For extensive skin lesions, itraconazole and terbinafine can speed up healing. Terbinafine is preferred over itraconazole due to fewer drug interactions.

== Treatment ==
Tinea corpora (body), tinea manus (hands), tinea cruris (groin), tinea pedis (foot) and tinea facie (face) can be treated topically.

Tinea unguium (nails) usually will require oral treatment with terbinafine, itraconazole, or griseofulvin. Griseofulvin is usually not as effective as terbinafine or itraconazole. A lacquer (Penlac) can be used daily, but is ineffective unless combined with aggressive debridement of the affected nail.

Tinea capitis (scalp) must be treated orally, as the medication must be present deep in the hair follicles to eradicate the fungus. Usually griseofulvin is given orally for 2 to 3 months. Clinically dosage up to twice the recommended dose might be used due to relative resistance of some strains of dermatophytes.

Tinea pedis is usually treated with topical medicines, like ketoconazole or terbinafine, and pills, or with medicines that contains miconazole, clotrimazole, or tolnaftate. Antibiotics may be necessary to treat secondary bacterial infections that occur in addition to the fungus (for example, from scratching).

Tinea cruris (groin) should be kept dry as much as possible.

== See also ==
- Hair perforation test
