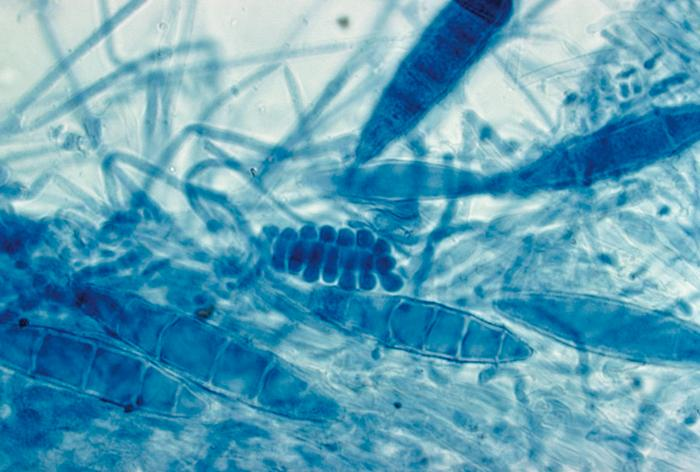

Scientific classification
- Domain: Eukaryota
- Kingdom: Fungi
- Division: Ascomycota
- Class: Eurotiomycetes
- Order: Onygenales
- Family: Arthrodermataceae
- Genus: Nannizzia
- Species: N. incurvata

Binomial name
- Nannizzia incurvata Stockdale, 1962

= Nannizzia incurvata =

Species of fungus

Nannizzia incurvata is a species of fungus. It is a heterothallic species.
