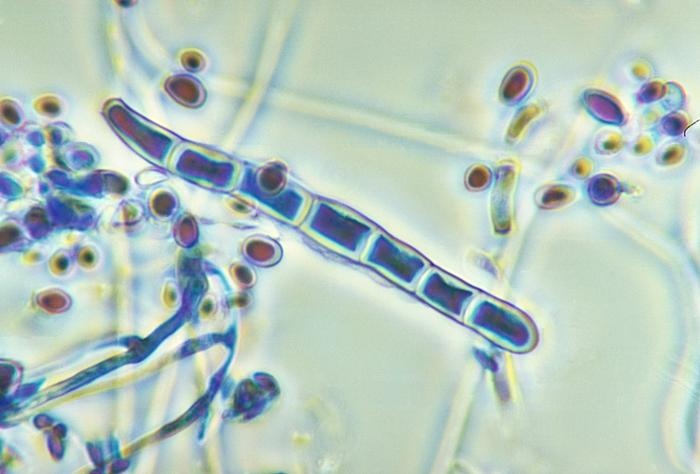
- Trichophyton rubrum

Scientific classification
- Kingdom: Fungi
- Division: Ascomycota
- Class: Eurotiomycetes
- Order: Onygenales
- Family: Arthrodermataceae
- Genus: Trichophyton; Malmsten

= Trichophyton =

Genus of Fungi

Trichophyton is a genus of fungus, which includes the parasitic varieties that cause tinea, including athlete's foot, ringworm, jock itch, and similar infections of the nail, beard, skin and scalp. Trichophyton fungi are molds characterized by the development of both smooth-walled macro- and microconidia. Macroconidia are mostly borne laterally directly on the hyphae or on short pedicels, and are thin- or thick-walled, clavate to fusiform, and range from 4 to 8 by 8 to 50 μm in size. Macroconidia are few or absent in many species. Microconidia are spherical, pyriform to clavate or of irregular shape, and range from 2 to 3 by 2 to 4 μm in size.

== Species and their habitat preference ==
According to current classification, the genus includes anthropophilic and zoophilic species. Anthropophilic fungi prefer to infect humans. Zoophilic fungi prefer to infect animals other than humans. Humans and other animals are natural reservoirs for parasitic or dermatophytic fungi.

Name	Botanical author	Environment
Trichophyton benhamiae	(Ajello & S.L. Cheng) Y. Gräser & de Hoog (2018)	zoophilic
Trichophyton bullosum	Lebasque (1933)	zoophilic
Trichophyton concentricum	R. Blanch. (1895)	anthropophilic
Trichophyton equinum	Gedoelst (1902)	zoophilic (horse)
Trichophyton erinacei	(J.M.B. Smith & Marples) Quaife (1966)	zoophilic (hedgehog)
Trichophyton eriotrephon	Papeg. (1925)	
Trichophyton mentagrophytes	(C.P. Robin) Sabour. (1895)	zoophilic (hedgehog)
Trichophyton quinckeanum	(Zopf ex Guég.) D.M. MacLeod & Muende (1940)	zoophilic (mouse)
Trichophyton rubrum	(Castell.) Sabour. (1911)	anthropophilic
Trichophyton schoenleinii	(Lebert) Langeron & Miloch. ex Nann. (1934)	anthropophilic
Trichophyton simii	(Pinoy) Stockdale, D.W.R. Mack. & Austwick (1965)	zoophilic (monkey, fowl)
Trichophyton soudanense	Joyeux (1912)	anthropophilic
Trichophyton tonsurans	Malmsten (1848)	anthropophilic
Trichophyton verrucosum	E. Bodin (1902)	zoophilic (cattle, horse)
Trichophyton violaceum	Sabour. ex E. Bodin (1902)	anthropophilic

Other accepted species;

- Trichophyton ajelloi (Vanbreus.) Ajello (1968)
- Trichophyton areolatum Negroni (1929)
- Trichophyton balcaneum Castell. (1919)
- Trichophyton batonrougei Castell. (1939)
- Trichophyton brumptii (Langeron & Baeza) N. Ansari & Faghih (1951)
- Trichophyton candelabrum Listemann (1973)
- Trichophyton cerebriforme Sabour. (1910)
- Trichophyton circonvolutum Sabour. (1910)
- Trichophyton denticulatum Sabour. (1910)
- Trichophyton depressum L. MacCarthy (1925)
- Trichophyton farinulentum Sabour. (1910)
- Trichophyton fischeri J. Kane (1977)
- Trichophyton flavescens A.A. Padhye & J.W. Carmich. (1971)
- Trichophyton floriforme Beintema (1934)
- Trichophyton fluviomuniense Pereiro (1968)
- Trichophyton fuligineum S. Ogata (1929)
- Trichophyton glabrum Sabour. (1910)
- Trichophyton gloriae Ajello (1967)
- Trichophyton gourvilii Catanei (1933)
- Trichophyton guzzonii Castell. (1939)
- Trichophyton immergens Miloch. (1937)
- Trichophyton indicum (Castell.) Nann. (1934)
- Trichophyton indotineae R. Kano, U. Kimura, M. Kakurai, J. Hiruma, H. Kamata, Y. Suga & K. Harada (2020)
- Trichophyton kanei Summerb. (1987)
- Trichophyton krajdenii J. Kane, J.A. Scott & Summerb. (1992)
- Trichophyton kuryangei Vanbreus. & S.A. Rosenthal (1961)
- Trichophyton longifusum (Flórián & Galgoczy) Ajello (1968)
- Trichophyton louisianicum Castell. (1927)
- Trichophyton mariatii Tap. Foss., Mizrachi, A.A. Padhye & Ajello (1980)
- Trichophyton megninii R. Blanch. (1895)
- Trichophyton milochevitchii (Langeron & Baeza) N. Ansari & Faghih (1951)
- Trichophyton multicolor O. Magalh. & J.A. Neves (1927)
- Trichophyton oceanicum Dompm., Drouhet & C. Moreau (1976)
- Trichophyton ochoterenai (Cif.) Nann. (1934)
- Trichophyton olexae Shohei Watan. (1977)
- Trichophyton pedis M. Ota (1922)
- Trichophyton plurizoniforme (L. MacCarthy) Rippon (1988)
- Trichophyton pratense Szathmáry (1941)
- Trichophyton proliferans M.P. English & Stockdale (1968)
- Trichophyton pseudotonsurans Biguet, G. Cochet, Deblock, Andrieu & Duc (1960)
- Trichophyton purpureum H. Bang (1910)
- Trichophyton radicosum Catanei (1937)
- Trichophyton raubitschekii J. Kane, Salkin, Weitzman & Smitka (1981)
- Trichophyton rotundum L. MacCarthy (1925)
- Trichophyton sabouraudii R. Blanch. (1895)
- Trichophyton sarkisovii L.G. Ivanova & I.D. Poljakov (1983)
- Trichophyton spadix (Y. Katô) Nann. (1934)
- Trichophyton teheraniense Ožeg. (1973)
- Trichophyton tenuishyphum Castell. (1939)
- Trichophyton vanbreuseghemii Rioux, Jarry & Juminer (1965)

== Mating and meiosis ==
Trichophyton mentagrophytes (Family Arthrodermataceae, Genus Trichophyton) is capable of both mating and meiosis.

== Effect on humans ==
The anthropophilic varieties cause forms of dermatophytosis, that is, fungal infection of the skin. They are keratinophilic: they feed on the keratin in nails, hair, and dead skin.

Trichophyton concentricum causes "Malabar itch", a skin infection consisting of an eruption of a number of concentric rings of overlapping scales forming papulosquamous patches.

Trichophyton rubrum and Trichophyton interdigitale cause athlete's foot (tinea pedis), toenail fungal infections (a.k.a. tinea unguium, a.k.a. onychomycosis), crotch itch (a.k.a. tinea cruris), and ringworm (a misnomer, as there is no worm involved; it is also known as tinea corporis). Trichophyton schoenleinii cause favus (tinea capitis),Trichophyton mentagrophytes var. mentagrophytes and Trichophyton verrucosum cause kerion (violent reaction results from infection with an animal dermatophytes). Fungal folliculitis is a rare hair follicle infection induced overwhelmingly by Trichophyton, which can be spread zoonotically. The fungi can easily spread to other areas of the body as well and to the host's home environs (socks, shoes, clothes, showers, bathtubs, counters, floors, carpets, etc.).

They can be transmitted by direct contact, by contact with infested particles (of dead skin, nails, hair) shed by the host, and by contact with the fungi's spores. These fungi thrive in warm moist dark environments, such as in the dead upper layers of skin between the toes of a sweaty foot inside a tightly enclosed shoe, or in dead skin particles on the wet floor of a communal (shared) shower. Their spores are extremely difficult to eliminate, and spread everywhere.

When the hyphae of the fungi burrow into the skin and release enzymes to digest keratin, they may irritate nerve endings and cause the host to itch, which may elicit the scratch reflex, which directs the host to scratch. Scratching directly transfers fungi and dead skin particles that are infested with the fungi to the fingers and under the finger nails. From there they can be transmitted to other parts of the host's body when the host touches or scratches those. Scratching also damages skin layers, making it easier for the fungi to spread at the site of the infection. If the fungi and infested debris are not washed from the fingers and fingernails soon enough, the fungi can also infect the skin of the fingers (tinea manuum), and burrow underneath and into the material of the fingernails (tinea unguium). If left untreated, the fungi continue to grow and spread.

== Treatments ==
A variety of zoophilic and anthropophilic dermatophyte treatments have varying levels of success based on species type. Treatments may take up to six months.

== See also ==
- Vioxanthin, a mycotoxin and pigment first isolated from Trichophyton violaceum
