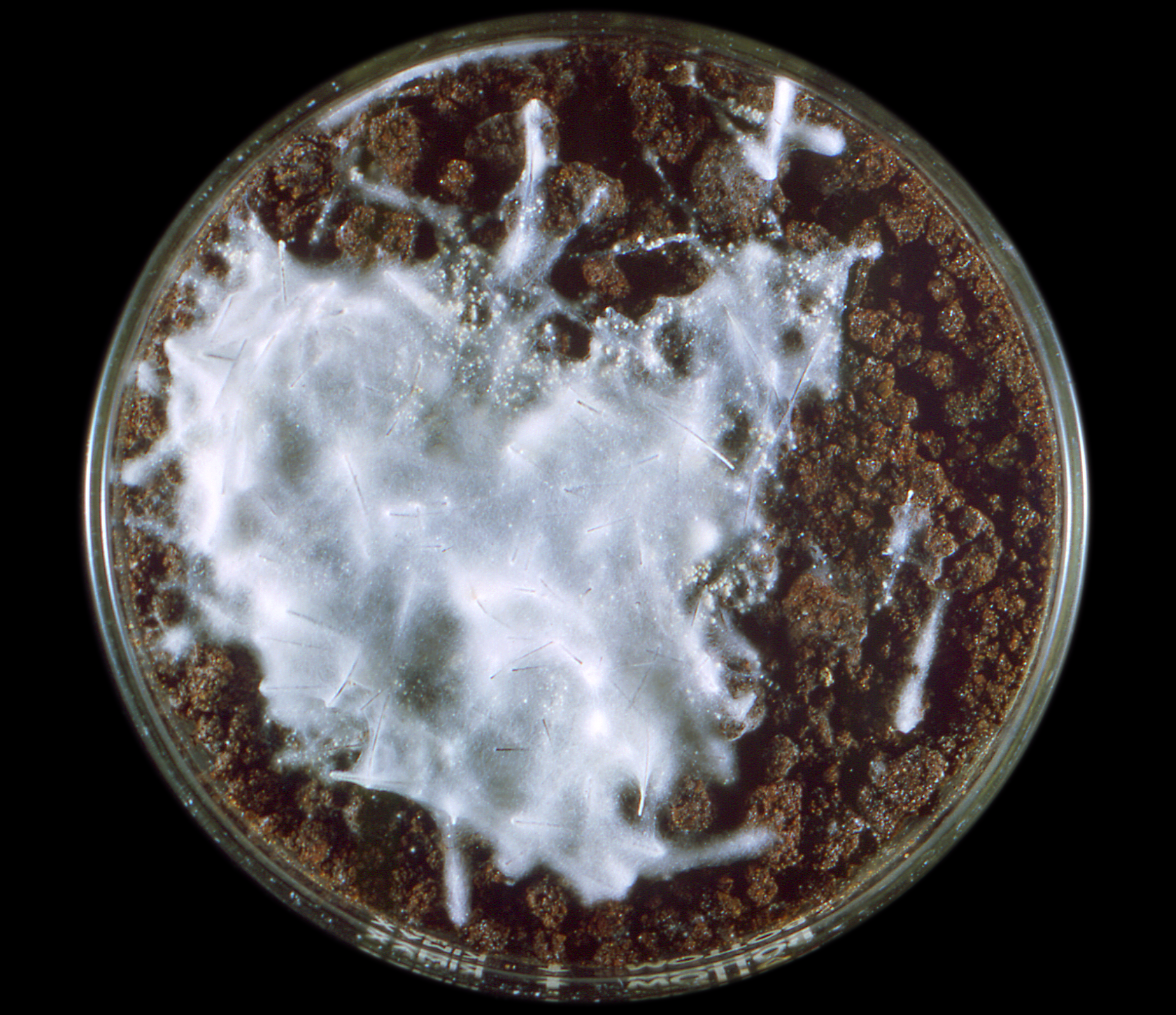

Scientific classification
- Kingdom: Fungi
- Division: Ascomycota
- Class: Eurotiomycetes
- Order: Onygenales
- Family: Arthrodermataceae
- Genus: Trichophyton
- Species: T. mentagrophytes

Binomial name
- Trichophyton mentagrophytes (Robin) Blanchard (1853)

= Trichophyton mentagrophytes =

Species of fungus

Trichophyton mentagrophytes is a species in the fungal genus Trichophyton, and the type species of the Trichophyton mentagrophytes complex. It is one of three common fungi which cause ringworm in companion animals. It is also the second-most commonly isolated fungus causing tinea infections in humans, and the most common or one of the most common fungi that cause zoonotic skin disease. Trichophyton mentagrophytes is frequently isolated from dogs, cats, rabbits, guinea pigs and other rodents, though at least some genetic variants possess the potential of human-to-human transmission, e.g. Type VII and Type VIII. As of 2024 it is an emerging STD in men who have sex with men and in sex workers of all genders.

== Nomenclature ==
Along with closely related T. interdigitale, the species has been traditionally treated as a part of polyphyletic assemblage, named "T. mentagrophytes sensu lato". From 1999 to 2017 the two species have been collectively referred to as T. interdigitale, while the name "T. mentagrophytes" has been used for current T. quinckeanum. Trichophyton interdigitale seems to be strictly anthropophilic, and is associated with foot and nail infections.

== Mating and meiosis ==
Trichophyton mentagrophytes is capable of mating. This species is also able to undergo meiosis. The haploid chromosome complement of T. mentagrophytes is four. The fusion of haploid nuclei (karyogamy) preceding meiosis occurs in the penultimate cell of a typical crozier, an anatomical feature of the sexual phase of many fungi in the Division Ascomycota.

== Trichophyton mentagrophytes VII (TMVII) ==
Trichophyton mentagrophytes type VII (TMVII, "TM seven") is an emerging sexually transmitted infection that causes genital tinea in humans. TMVII cases have been reported in men who have sex with men in France since 2021 and in the United States since 2024. Previously, infections had been reported in men who traveled to Southeast Asia for sex tourism and among Nigerian sex workers. As of 2026, there is evidence of ongoing transmission in Europe and cases have been reported in multiple United States cities, including an ongoing outbreak in the Twin Cities.

TMVII causes ringworm (tinea) of the genitals, buttocks, face, trunk, and limbs. It is believed to be spread via skin-to-skin contact and contact with contaminated surfaces such as bedding. Treatment may require a prolonged course of oral antifungal medication such as terbinafine.

== Effect in mammals ==
Trichophyton mentagrophytes is one of three common fungi which cause ringworm in companion animals and frequently isolated from dogs, cats, rabbits, guinea pigs and other rodents.

It is the most common or one of the most common fungi that cause zoonotic skin disease (i.e., transmission of mycotic skin disease from species to species).

While it is considered a zoophilic species, it is also the second-most commonly isolated fungus causing tinea infections in humans, and at least some genetic variants possess the potential of human-to-human transmission, e.g. type VII.

== Pathology ==
Out of all species considered to be a part of the Trichophyton mentagrophytes complex, T. mentagrophytes causes the most severe form of symptoms in humans, including pustules, abscesses and ulceration, and induces a strong inflammatory response in the infected tissue. It causes infections mostly on the trunk, legs and arms (tinea corporis) or on the scalp (tinea capitis), where it mainly targets the keratinocytes of the epidermis.

T. mentagrophytes induces robust cell death in keratinocytes, more so than the other species in the complex. It causes these effects through different components: necrosis mainly through its hyphae, and apoptosis through its supernatant. The apoptotic effect of the supernatant is attributed to SN-38, a compound best known as an active metabolite of irinotecan, a drug used in cancer treatment.

== Epidemiology ==
Particular genetic variants of the fungus have distinct geographical ranges.

For studies on the epidemiology of T. mentagrophytes, two molecular strain typing techniques are available. The first one is based upon amplification of nontranscribed spacer of ribosomal DNA, and the second one involves a comparison of internal transcribed spacer sequences within defined boundaries.

== Treatment and drug resistance ==
In T. mentagrophytes, antifungal drug resistance is mainly associated with Type VIII isolates. Drug-resistant T. mentagrophytes strains have been found in many places across Asia and Europe. India is the most affected country, with the rate of microbiological resistance to terbinafine estimated at 11.4%. There are also reports on terbinafine-resistant Type II isolates from Japan and Denmark.

== See also ==
- Trichophyton indotineae, recently characterized species previously classified as T. mentagrophytes type VIII
