= Dermatophyte test medium =

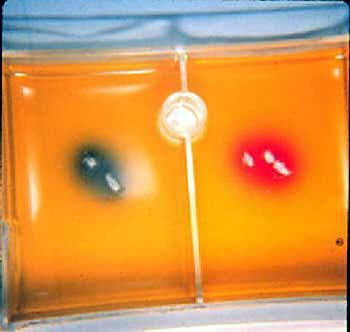
DTM plate on the right showing color change after two days' growth; Microsporum canis

Dermatophyte test medium (DTM) is a specialized agar used in medical mycology. It is based on Sabouraud's dextrose agar with added cycloheximide to inhibit saprotrophic growth, antibiotic to inhibit bacterial growth, and phenol red a pH indicator. The pH indicator is useful in distinguishing a dermatophyte fungus, which utilizes nitrogenous material for preferred metabolism, producing alkaline by-products, imparting a red color change to the medium. Typical saprotrophic fungi utilize carbohydrates in the medium producing acidic by-products and no red color change.
