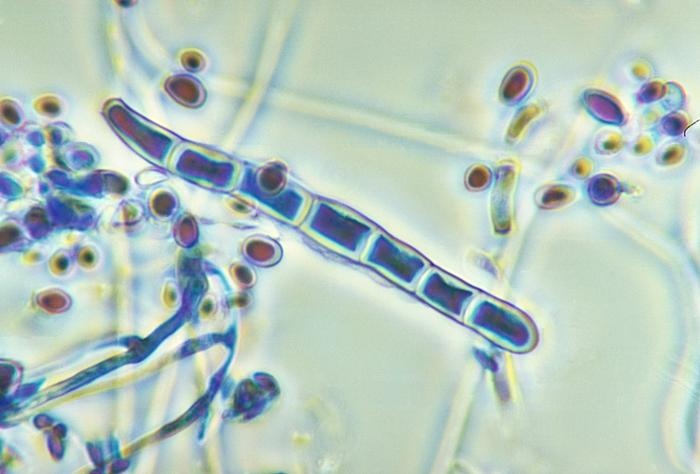

Scientific classification
- Kingdom: Fungi
- Division: Ascomycota
- Class: Eurotiomycetes
- Order: Onygenales
- Family: Arthrodermataceae
- Genus: Trichophyton
- Species: T. erinacei

Binomial name
- Trichophyton erinacei (J.M.B. Smith & Marples) Quaife

= Trichophyton erinacei =

Species of fungus

Trichophyton erinacei is a species in the fungal genus Trichophyton that is associated with hedgehogs. The fungi is normally isolated from the quills and underbelly of hedgehogs. Common symptoms of infection include crusting around the face and loss of spines. Trichophyton erinacei is also known to affect humans through hedgehog contact that transmits the fungi. Infections can also occur with indirect contact.
