= Tinea imbricata =

- Other names: Tokelau
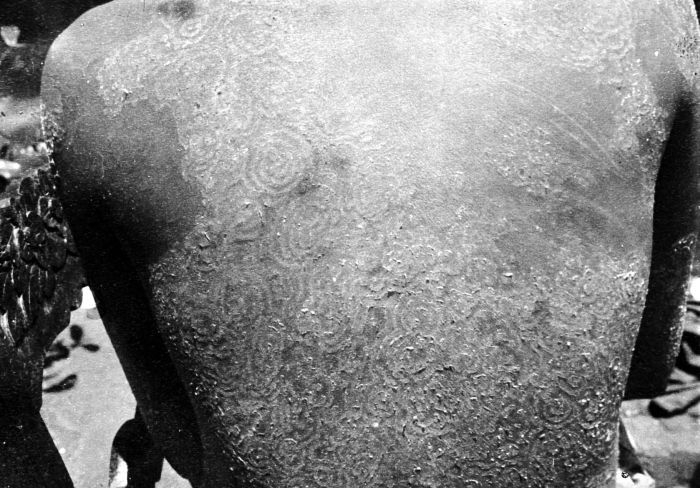
- Tinea imbricata
- Specialty: Dermatology

Tinea imbricata (also known in parts of Indonesia as “Kaskado”) is a superficial fungal infection of the skin limited to southwest Polynesia, Melanesia, Southeast Asia, India, and Central America. The skin lesions, often itchy, occur mainly in the torso and limbs. The name tinea imbricata is derived from the Latin for "tiled" (imbricatus) since the lesions are often lamellar. The lesions are often treated with griseofulvin or terbinafine.

The condition has also become known as "Tokelau" - the name apparently references the islands of Tokelau in the South Pacific.

The risk of developing tinea imbricata is probably inherited as an autosomal recessive trait.

Tinea imbricata is associated with Trichophyton concentricum.

== Tinea pseudoimbricata ==
The term "tinea pseudoimbricata" synonymous with "tinea indecisiva", was coined to describe a form of tinea mimicking the concentric rings of tinea imbricata, but is caused by local or systemic immunosuppression. Since then, 3 cases of Trichophyton tonsurans have been associated with it, as well as Trichophyton rubrum which can trigger mycosis fungoides. Mixed infections with scabies have been described to produce tinea pseudoimbricata.

As of 2015 in India, corticosteroid–antifungal–antibacterial combinations sold as over-the-counter drug have led to an increase in chronic, recurrent, difficult to treat fungal infections of the skin, including tinea pseudoimbricata.

== See also ==
- Skin lesion
- List of cutaneous conditions
