= Nannizzia fulva =

Scientific classification
- Kingdom: Fungi
- Division: Ascomycota
- Class: Eurotiomycetes
- Order: Onygenales
- Family: Arthrodermataceae
- Genus: Nannizzia
- Species: N. fulva

Binomial name
- Nannizzia fulva Stockdale, 1964

Species of fungus

Nannizzia fulva is a species of fungus. It is a heterothallic species.
