= Kerion =

- Kerion

Kerion or kerion celsi is an acute inflammatory process which is the result of the host's response to a fungal ringworm infection of the hair follicles of the scalp (occasionally the beard) that can be accompanied by secondary bacterial infection(s). It usually appears as raised, spongy lesions, and typically occurs in children. This honeycomb is a painful inflammatory reaction with deep suppurative lesions on the scalp. Follicles may be seen discharging pus. There may be sinus formation and rarely mycetoma-like grains are produced. It is usually caused by dermatophytes (fungal infections of the skin affecting humans and animals) such as Trichophyton verrucosum, T. mentagrophytes, and Microsporum canis. Treatment with oral griseofulvin is common.

== Symptoms and signs ==
There may be loss of hair as hair will come out easily. Sometimes, there is growth of organisms. Lymph and fever symptoms may be present. This condition can be mistaken for a case of impetigo.

== Diagnosis ==
The basis for the diagnosis of kerion is clinical finding, positive microscopic examinations (such as positive KOH preparation, Lactophenol cotton blue wet mount, Chicago sky blue stained (CSB) slide, Calcofluor white stained slide, Periodic acid–Schiff stained slide, and Gomori’s methenamine silver stained slide), mycological culture and modern molecular tests (such as PCR-reverse line blot test, real-time PCR test, multiplex PCR test, PCR-ELISA test, and MALDI-TOF test) of clinical specimens. Wood's lamp (blacklight) examination will reveal a bright green to yellow-green fluorescence of hairs infected by Trichophyton mentagrophytes var. Mentagrophytes, in kerion infection caused by Trichophyton verrucosum Invaded hairs show an ectothrix infection and fluorescence under Wood's ultra-violet light has been noted in cattle but not in humans.

=== Differential Diagnosis ===
Kerion has been called a great mimicker. It can be easily confused with bacterial scalp abscess and various other conditions.

In a recent report, a previously well 9-year-old boy presented to the outpatient clinic with a tender, swollen occipital scalp lesion progressing over one month’s duration. He was initially misdiagnosed as having a bacterial infection, and was given a 2 weeks’ course of oral cephalexin. No improvement was noticed after the course.

It was only after the scalp scrapings were examined, that the child was found to be having a local infection with the fungus Trichophyton tonsurans, which had resulted in kerion. Antifungal therapy was then started, which resulted in complete cure.

== Treatment ==
Unlike most other manifestations of Tinea dermatophyte infections, Kerion is not sufficiently treated with topical antifungals and requires systemic therapy. Typical therapy consists of oral antifungals, such as griseofulvin or terbinafine, for a sustained duration of at least 6 to 8 weeks depending on severity. Successful treatment of kerion often requires empiric bacterial antibiotics given the high prevalence of secondary bacterial infection.

== See also ==
- Favus
- List of cutaneous conditions
