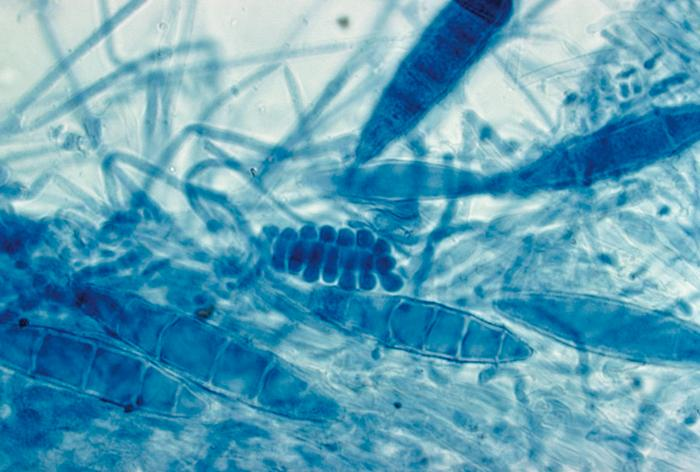
- Nannizzia incurvata

Scientific classification
- Domain: Eukaryota
- Kingdom: Fungi
- Division: Ascomycota
- Class: Eurotiomycetes
- Order: Onygenales
- Family: Arthrodermataceae
- Genus: Nannizzia; Stockdale, 1961

Type species
- Nannizzia incurvata

Species
- See text

= Nannizzia =

Genus of fungi

Nannizzia is a genus of fungus in the family Arthrodermataceae.

The genus name of Nannizzia is in honour of Arturo Nannizzi (1877-1961), who was an Italian botanist, docent in Mycology and in 1935 was Director of the Botanical Garden in Siena.

The genus was circumscribed by Phyllis Margaret Stockdale in Sabouraudia vol.1 on page 45 in 1961.

== Species ==
Species accepted within Nannizzia include:

- Nannizzia aenigmatica
- Nannizzia borellii
- Nannizzia cajetana
- Nannizzia cookiella
- Nannizzia corniculata
- Nannizzia duboisii
- Nannizzia fulva
- Nannizzia graeserae
- Nannizzia grubyi
- Nannizzia gypsea
- Nannizzia incurvata
- Nannizzia nana
- Nannizzia obtusa
- Nannizzia ossicola
- Nannizzia otae
- Nannizzia persicolor
- Nannizzia praecox
- Nannizzia quinckeana
- Nannizzia racemosa
