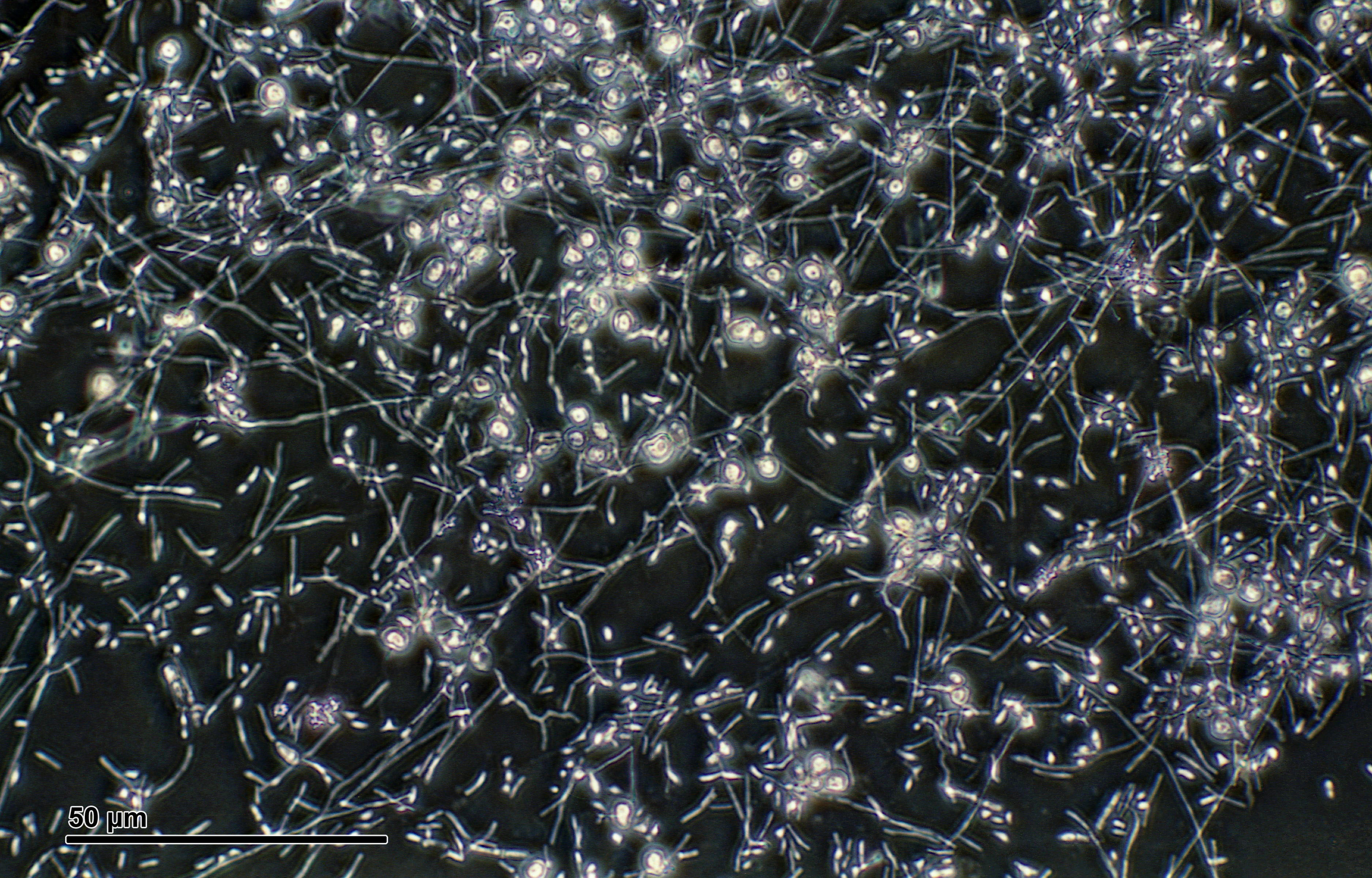
- Trichophyton mentagrophytes

Scientific classification
- Kingdom: Fungi
- Division: Ascomycota
- Class: Eurotiomycetes
- Order: Onygenales
- Family: Arthrodermataceae
- Genus: Trichophyton
- Species: T. interdigitale

Binomial name
- Trichophyton interdigitale Priestley (1917)

= Trichophyton interdigitale =

Species of fungus

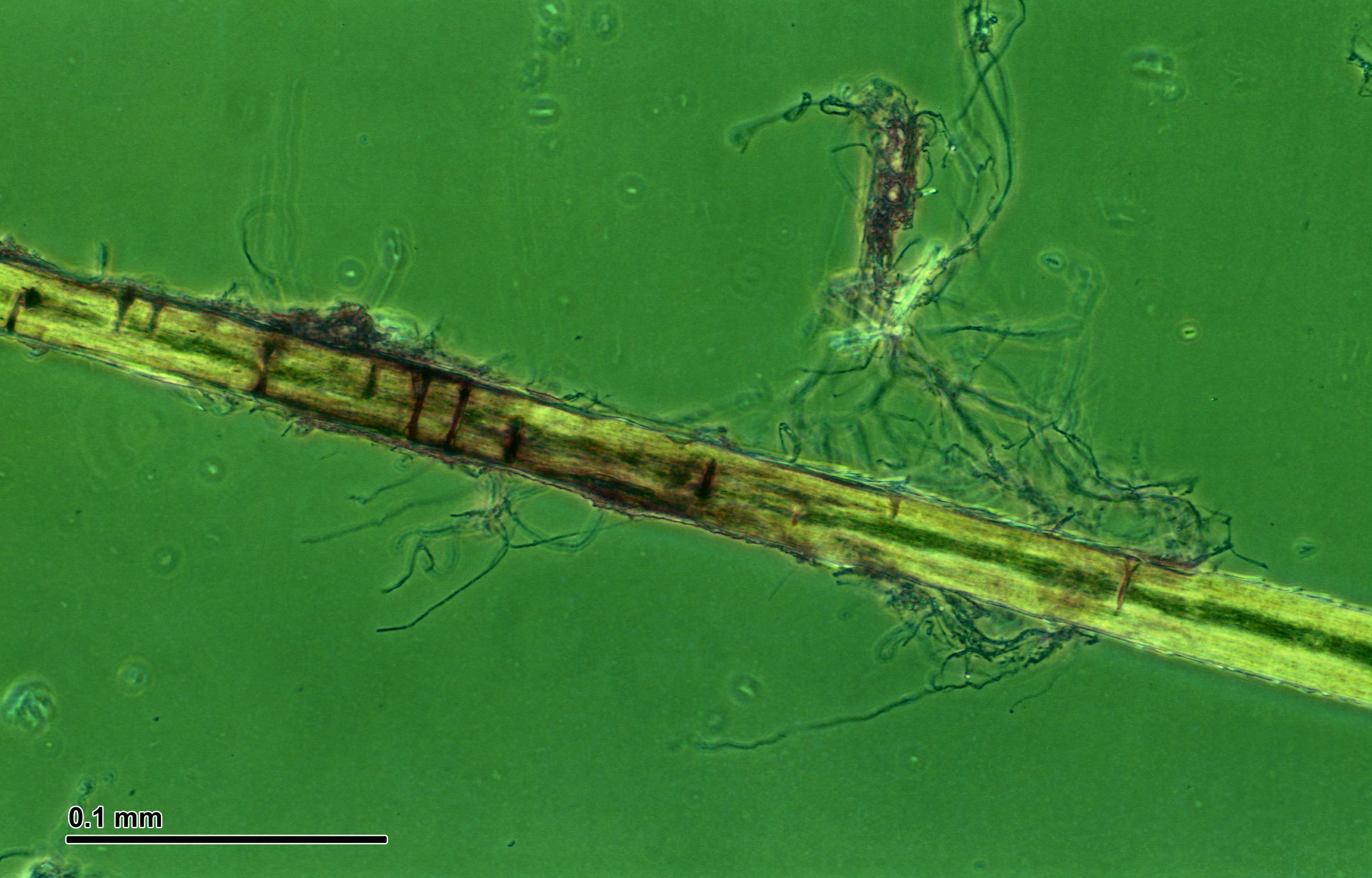
Trichophyton mentagrophytes on a hair

Trichophyton interdigitale is a clonal line within sexual species T. mentagrophytes. It causes onychomycosis and tinea pedis in humans, and has never been isolated from animals. Trichophyton interdigitale isolates cannot be reliably discriminated from T. mentagrophytes by cultural techniques or MALDI-TOF mass spectrometry, and therefore ITS region DNA sequencing is recommended.

== Critics ==
Trichophyton interdigitale is defined by its capability of transmission between human hosts and clonal way of reproduction. However, there is at least one another anthropophilic clonal line within T. mentagrophytes, phylogenetically unrelated to T. interdigitale.
