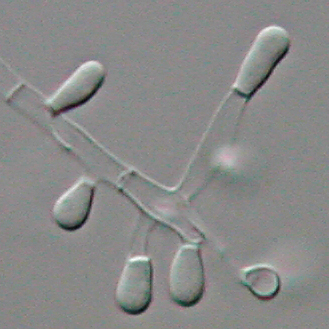

Scientific classification
- Kingdom: Fungi
- Division: Ascomycota
- Class: Eurotiomycetes
- Order: Onygenales
- Family: Arthrodermataceae
- Genus: Trichophyton
- Species: T. tonsurans

Binomial name
- Trichophyton tonsurans Malmsten (1848)

= Trichophyton tonsurans =

Species of fungus

Trichophyton tonsurans is a fungus in the family Arthrodermataceae that causes ringworm infection of the scalp. It was first recognized by David Gruby in 1844. Isolates are characterized as the "–" or negative mating type of the Arthroderma vanbreuseghemii complex. This species is thought to be conspecific with T. equinum, although the latter represents the "+" mating strain of the same biological species Despite their biological conspecificity, clones of the two mating types appear to have undergone evolutionary divergence with isolates of the T. tonsurans-type consistently associated with Tinea capitis (particularly in children) whereas the T. equinum-type, as its name implies, is associated with horses as a regular host. Phylogenetic relationships were established in isolates from Northern Brazil, through fingerprinting polymorphic RAPD and M13 markers. There seems to be lower genomic variability in the T. tonsurans species due to allopatric divergence. Any phenotypic density is likely due to environmental factors, not genetic characteristics of the fungus.

== Colony morphology ==
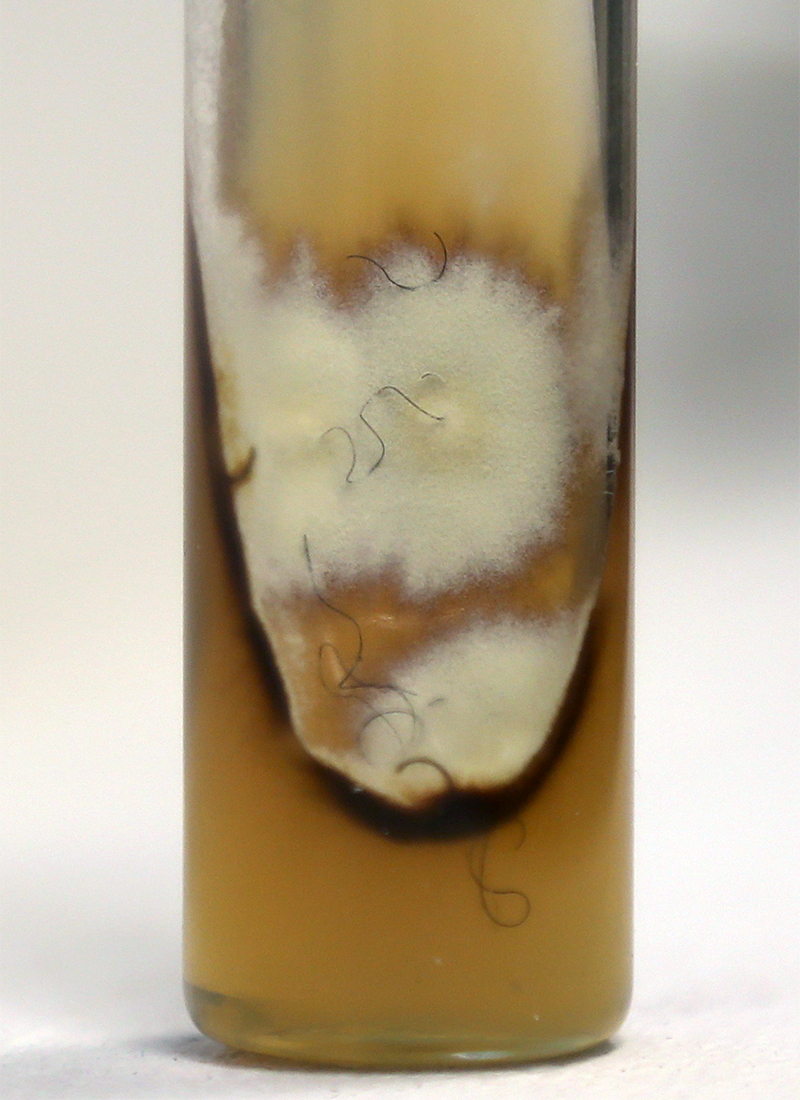
Colony of Trichophyton tonsurans from scalp scraping cultured on Sabouraud's dextrose agar with cycloheximide, chloramphenicol and gentamicin (7 d)

Trichophyton tonsurans may be identified through analysis of its fast-growing colonies. Colonies tend to be flat, powdery, and yellow with a reddish undercolour. It develops into a folded colony, and may vary in colour from off-white to grey, with dark pigments that may diffuse into the medium. The younger colonies fluoresce green on Sabouraud's agar, and are also flat, but are mahogany red or lemon-yellow coloured. On this agar the fungus grows peripherally and develops into a flatter, creamy disk with raised edges. Trichophyton tonsurans also produces many inflated, pear-shaped microconidia, borne on matchstick-like stalks. It also forms fewer macroconidia that are 4-6 cells long, with thick cell walls.

A different simple method for identification at early stages is through the detection of chlamydospore-like structures (CLS), which are found on the reverse side of the culture under light microscopy. Chlamydospores are asexual spores that are created through hyphal modification, often with thick cell walls arising from the deposition of hydrophobic materials along the original cell wall. After inoculation on culture media (such as commonly used Mycosel agar), mycelia extend into the media and create the CLS. Normally, strains will produce CLS regardless of the media it is grown on. CLS growth is essentially unaffected by antibiotic treatment with chloramphenicol, as well as by cycloheximide. After 5 days of incubation, CLS production will be evident, suggesting the fungus is highly likely to be T. tonsurans.

Responses of T. tonsurans to different growth conditions and nutrient media is useful in aiding identification. For example, growth is enhanced in the presence of thiamine, and this exogenous requirement for thiamine distinguishes T. tonsurans from similar species. Since thiamine stimulates growth, T. tonsurans also displays this behaviour on vitamin-free, thiamine-supplemented casamino acids agar but the growth is more sparse, and subsurface growth is absent. BCP-milk solids glucose agar can also be used as an indicator of this fungus. This medium turns from pale blue to purple in colour in 7–14 days of growth at 25 °C (77 °F). The colour change is due to an alkaline shift arising from the release of ammonium during protein hydrolysis.

== Epidemiology ==
Trichophyton tonsurans causes tinea capitis infection globally, but it is especially endemic in Latin America (especially northern Brazil), Mexico, and Africa. Infections due to this species have become increasingly common in the United States and Canada since the 1980s as a consequence of changing patterns in global travel and immigration, and it is responsible for a majority of pediatric tinea capitis infections in the US.

The modes of dispersal are unclear, though it is associated with homes, schools and other institutions, and barbershops. Transmission can occur through direct transfer, or through the use of shared resources and facilities such as pillows, couches, rugs, and pets, which should be thoroughly examined because they can be carriers of T. tonsurans. Children are most susceptible to Tinea capitis whereas adult infections more often manifest as tinea corporis. This species is a major cause of family and institutional outbreaks because of its persistent nature in indoor environments, and its ability to be transmitted through asymptomatic carriers.

== Pathophysiology ==
Once the fungal infection has been contracted, it invades hairs and sporulates in the hair shaft, causing it to burst and curl, creating a black dot on the scalp. Tinea capitis is the clinical disease, but it may also cause Tinea corporis, onychomycosis, and Tinea pedis. Cutaneous lesions due to T. tonsurans do not fluoresce under Wood's Lamp. Although some people may not show the symptoms of carrying T. tonsurans, it has a distinctive manifestation. During pathogenesis, the fungus undergoes protease elaboration to hydrolyze structural proteins (such as the keratin found in hair), and isolates show peak values between days 18–22 during the sporulation phase.

There are potentially 23 genes that may have mechanistic roles of this skin infection, and 21 show significant differences in infection rates, especially among children. The genes are typically involved in leukocyte activation and migration, and formation and integrity of the extracellular matrix. In molecular studies of its virulence, common target genes include CarbM14, CER, and Sub2, which encode the proteases carboxypeptidase, ceraminidase, and subtilisin, respectively. Among other virulence-related enzymes, T. tonsurans also produces urease.

This fungus has also been found to produce melanin, which may be phenotypically demonstrated through in vitro induction in caffeic acid media. Melanin acts as an antioxidant molecule, providing protective properties to the fungus from damaging UV rays. Since it is endemic in sunny regions, the melanin production is perhaps crucial for survival.

In early stages of infection, the lesion has a clear and raised border, although there is not much hair loss yet. However, as it progresses, infected hairs break off at the scalp surface and the scalp is eventually coated in a scaly layer, with short hair stubs remaining. Twisted hairs may be found in keratotic follicular papules that will be formed. The infection is often called "black dot ringworm" due to the small dark hair stubs that are found on the scalp. Inflammatory reactions are also quite common and can manifest as edema, abscess, or highly inflammatory kerion. Hair regrowth does occur, although some scarring may remain. Males have a tendency to show greater improvement in non-inflammatory presentation as well. Although there are several treatments available, tinea capitis often has no subjective symptoms, so people at risk for infection should still receive fungal examinations regularly.

== Treatment ==
Treatment options include antifungal shampoo, systemic antifungals, or both. Oral therapy is indicated for complicated infections of those that fail to respond to topical treatment. Still, the use of selenium sulphide or povidone-iodine shampoos greatly reduce fungal viability and may be helpful in person-to-person transmission. Advancements have been made in detection of T. tonsurans in patients with Tinea capitis, using TaqMan PCR assay and primers and probes designed to detect this fungus rapidly and specifically, excluding contaminating skin microorganisms.
