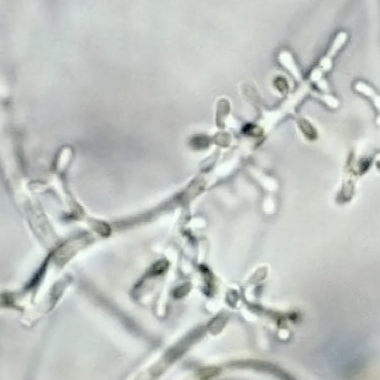
- Microconidia of T. rubrum

Scientific classification
- Kingdom: Fungi
- Division: Ascomycota
- Class: Eurotiomycetes
- Order: Onygenales
- Family: Arthrodermataceae
- Genus: Trichophyton
- Species: T. rubrum

Binomial name
- Trichophyton rubrum (Castell.) Sabour.

Synonyms
- Trichophyton megninii R. Blanch. (1895); Trichophyton fischeri J. Kane (1977); Trichophyton raubitschekii J. Kane, Salkin, Weitzman & Smitka (1982); Trichophyton kanei Summerbell (1987); Epidermophyton purpureum (H. Bang) C.W. Dodge, Sabouraudiella purpurea (H. Bang) Boedijn

= Trichophyton rubrum =

Species of fungus

Trichophyton rubrum is a dermatophytic fungus in the phylum Ascomycota. It is an exclusively clonal, anthropophilic saprotroph that colonizes the upper layers of dead skin, and is the most common cause of athlete's foot, fungal infection of nail, jock itch, and ringworm worldwide. Trichophyton rubrum was first described by Malmsten in 1845 and is currently considered to be a complex of species that comprises multiple, geographically patterned morphotypes, several of which have been formally described as distinct taxa, including T. raubitschekii, T. gourvilii, T. megninii and T. soudanense.

== Growth and morphology ==
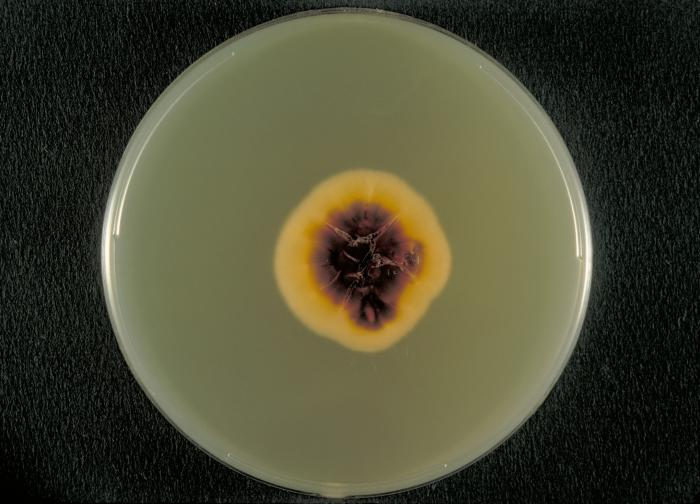
Bottom view of a Sabouraud agar plate with a colony of Trichophyton rubrum var. rodhainii.

Typical isolates of T. rubrum are white and cottony on the surface. The colony underside is usually red, although some isolates appear more yellowish and others more brownish. Trichophyton rubrum grows slowly in culture with sparse production of teardrop or peg-shaped microconidia laterally on fertile hyphae. Macroconidia, when present, are smooth-walled and narrowly club-shaped, although most isolates lack macroconidia. Growth is inhibited in the presence of certain sulfur-, nitrogen- and phosphorus-containing compounds. Isolates of T. rubrum are known to produce penicillin in vitro and in vivo.

=== Variants ===
Strains of T. rubrum form two distinct biogeographical subpopulations. One is largely restricted to parts of Africa and southern Asia, while the other consists of a population that has spread around the world. Isolates of the Afro-Asiatic subpopulation most commonly manifest clinically as tinea corporis and tinea capitis. In contrast, the globally-distributed subpopulation manifests predominantly in tinea pedis and tinea unguium. Different members of the T. rubrum complex are endemic to different regions; isolates previously referred to T. megninii originate from Portugal, while T. soudanense and T. gourvilii are found in Sub-Saharan Africa. All species included in the T. rubrum complex are "–" mating type with the exception of T. megninii which represents the "+" mating type and is auxotrophic for L-histidine. The mating type identity of T. soudanense remains unknown. Trichophyton raubitschekii, which is common from northwestern India and southeast Asia as well as parts of West Africa, is characterized by strongly granular colonies and is the only variant in the complex that reliably produces urease. In addition to the regioselectivity of these variants of the genus Trichophyton, combinations of varying species of the genus can have multiplicative effects that are invisible to the host immune system, resulting in potentially chronic infection.

== Diagnostic tests ==
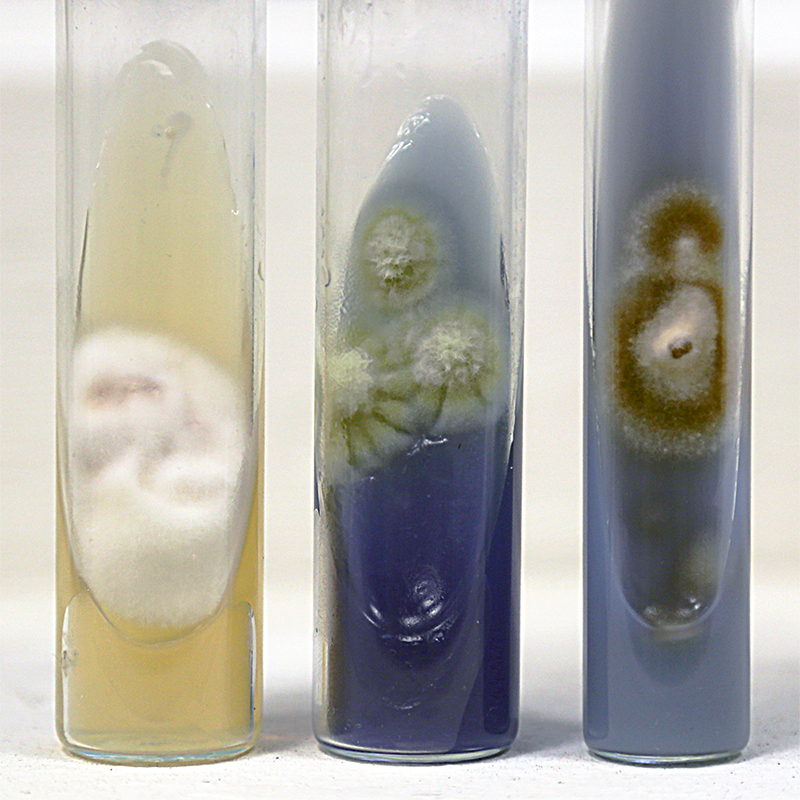
Colonies of T. rubrum isolated from toenail (left to right): Primary isolation from scrapings on Sabouraud's dextrose agar with cycloheximide, chloramphenicol and gentamicin (14 d); Greenish colonies on Littman Oxgall agar (14 d); Restricted, red colony without pH change on Bromocresol Purple Milk Solids Glucose agar (10 d).

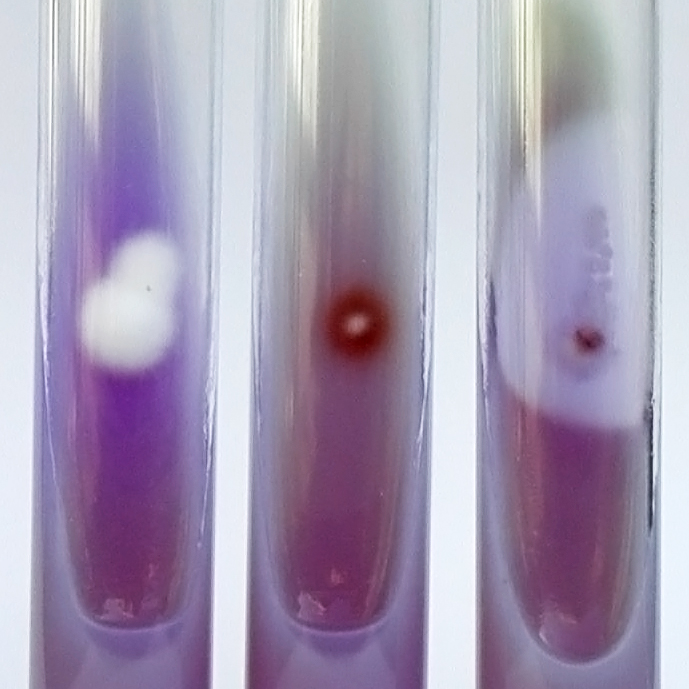
Colonies of T. mentagrophytes (left), T. rubrum (center) and T. violaceum (right) showing differential responses on Bromocresol Purple Milk Solids Glucose agar (7 d). T. mentagrophytes shows unrestricted growth with alkaline (purple) colour change, T. rubrum shows restricted growth with no pH change, and T. violaceum produces weak growth accompanied by clearing of the milk solids and a purple colour change.

As a preliminary test indicating infection, plucked hairs and skin and nail scrapings can be directly viewed under a microscope for detection of fungal elements. T. rubrum cannot be distinguished from other dermatophytes in this direct examination. It can be distinguished in vitro from other dermatophytes by means of characteristic micromorphology in culture, usually consisting of small, tear-drop-shaped microconidia, as well as its usual blood-red colony reverse pigmentation on most growth media. In addition, the Bromocresol purple (BCP) milk solid glucose agar test can be used to distinguish it. Different Trichophyton species release different amounts of ammonium ion, altering the pH of this medium. In this test, medium supporting T. rubrum remains sky blue, indicating neutral pH, until 7 to 10 days after inoculation. In primary outgrowth on Sabouraud dextrose agar with cycloheximide and antibacterials, contaminating organisms may cause confusion, as T. rubrum colonies deprived of glucose by competing contaminants may grow without forming the species' distinctive red pigment. Both antibiotic-resistant bacteria and saprotrophic fungi may outcompete T. rubrum for glucose if they contaminate the sample. Red pigment production can be restored in such contaminated isolates using casamino acids erythritol albumin agar (CEA). T. rubrum cultures can be isolated on both cycloheximide-containing media and cycloheximide-free media. The latter are conventionally used for the detection of nail infections caused by non-dermatophytes such as Neoscytalidium dimidiatum. A skin test is ineffective in diagnosing active infection and often yields false negative results.

== Pathology ==
Trichophyton rubrum is rarely isolated from animals. In humans, men are more often infected than women. Infections can manifest as both chronic and acute forms. Typically T. rubrum infections are restricted to the upper layers of the epidermis; however, deeper infections are possible. Approximately 80–93% of chronic dermatophyte infections in many parts of the developed world are thought to be caused by T. rubrum, including cases of tinea pedis (foot), tinea unguium (nail), tinea manuum (hand), tinea cruris (groin), and tinea corporis (arms and leg), as well as some cases of tinea barbae (beard). Trichophyton rubrum has also been known to cause folliculitis in which case it is characterized by fungal element in follicles and foreign body giant cells in the dermis. A T. rubrum infection may also form a granuloma. Extensive granuloma formations may occur in patients with immune deficiencies (e.g. Cushing syndrome). Immunodeficient neonates are susceptible to systemic T. rubrum infection.

Trichophyton rubrum infections do not elicit strong inflammatory responses, as this agent suppresses cellular immune responses involving lymphocytes particularly T cells. Mannan, a component of the fungal cell wall, can also suppress immune responses, although the mechanism of action remains unknown. Trichophyton rubrum infection has been associated with the induction of an id reaction in which an infection in one part of the body induces an immune response in the form of a sterile rash at a remote site. The most common clinical forms of T. rubrum infection are described below.

=== Foot ===
Trichophyton rubrum is one of the most common causes of chronic tinea pedis commonly known as athlete's foot. Chronic infections of tinea pedis result in moccasin foot, in which the entire foot forms white scaly patches and infections usually affect both feet. Individuals with tinea pedis are likely to have infection at multiple sites. Infections can be spontaneously cured or controlled by topical antifungal treatment. Although T. rubrum tinea pedis in children is extremely rare, it has been reported in children as young as two years of age.

=== Hand ===
Tinea manuum is commonly caused by T. rubrum and is characterized by unilateral infections of the palm of the hand.

=== Groin ===
Along with E. floccosum, T. rubrum is the most common cause of this disease, also known as 'jock itch.' Infections cause reddish brown lesions mainly on the upper thighs and trunk, that are border by raised edge.

=== Nail ===
Once considered a rare causative agent, T. rubrum is now the most common cause of invasive fungal nail disease (called onychomycosis or tinea unguium). Nail invasion by T. rubrum tends to be restricted to the underside of the nail plate and is characterized by the formation of white plaques on the lunula that can spread to the entire nail. The nail often thickens and becomes brittle, turns brown or black. Infections by T. rubrum are frequently chronic, remaining limited to the nails of only one or two digits for many years without progression. Spontaneous cure is rare. These infections are usually unresponsive to topical treatments and respond only to systemic therapy. Although it is most frequently seen in adults, T. rubrum nail infections have been recorded in children.

== Epidemiology ==
It is thought that Trichophyton rubrum evolved from a zoophilic ancestor, establishing itself ultimately as an exclusive agent of dermatophytosis on human hosts. Genetic analyses of T. rubrum have revealed the presence of heat shock proteins, transporters, metabolic enzymes and a system of up-regulation of key enzymes in the glyoxylate cycle. The species secretes more than 20 different proteases, including exopeptidases and endopeptidases. These proteases allow T. rubrum to digest human keratin, collagen and elastin; they have an optimum pH of 8 and are calcium dependent. Although T. rubrum shares phylogenetic affiliations with other dermatophytes, it has a distinctive protein regulation system.

== Transmission ==
This species has a propensity to infect glabrous (hairless) skin and is only exceptionally known from other sites. Transmission occurs via infected towels, linens, clothing (contributing factors are high humidity, heat, perspiration, diabetes mellitus, obesity, friction from clothes). Infection can be avoided by lifestyle and hygiene modifications, such as avoiding walking barefoot on damp floors, particularly in communal areas.

== Treatment ==
Treatment depends on the locus and severity of infection. For tinea pedis, many antifungal creams such as miconazole nitrate, clotrimazole, tolnaftate (a synthetic thiocarbamate), terbinafine hydrochloride, butenafine hydrochloride and undecylenic acid are effective. For more severe or complicated infections, oral ketoconazole was historically shown to be an effective treatment for T. rubrum infections, but is no longer used for this indication due to the risk of liver damage as a side effect. Oral terbinafine, itraconazole or fluconazole have all been shown to be safer, effective treatments. Terbinafine and naftifine (topical creams) have been successfully used to treat tinea cruris and tinea corporis caused by T. rubrum. Trichophyton rubrum infections have been found to be susceptible to photodynamic treatment, laser irradiation, and photoactivation of rose bengal dye by green laser light.

Tinea unguium presents a much greater therapeutic challenge, as topical creams do not penetrate the nail bed. Historically, systemic griseofulvin treatment showed improvements in some patients with tinea unguium; however, failure was common even in lengthy treatment courses, e.g., greater than onr\e year. Current treatment modalities include oral terbinafine, oral itraconazole, and intermittent "pulse therapy" with oral itraconazole Fingernail infections can be treated in 6–8 weeks, while toenail infections may take up to 12 weeks to achieve cure. Topical treatment by occlusive dressing combining 20% urea paste with 2% tolnaftate have also shown promise in softening the nail plate to promote penetration of the antifungal agent to the nail bed.
