= Sabouraud agar =

Agar media containing peptones

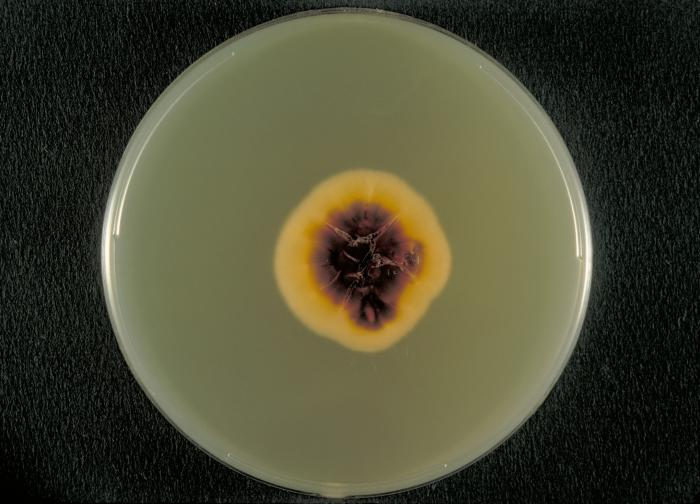
Bottom view of a Sabouraud agar plate with a colony of Trichophyton rubrum var. rodhaini

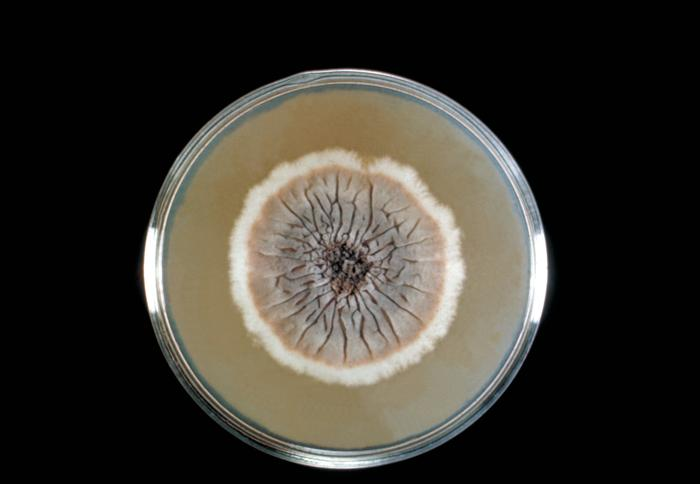
Sporothrix schenckii in Sabouraud agar

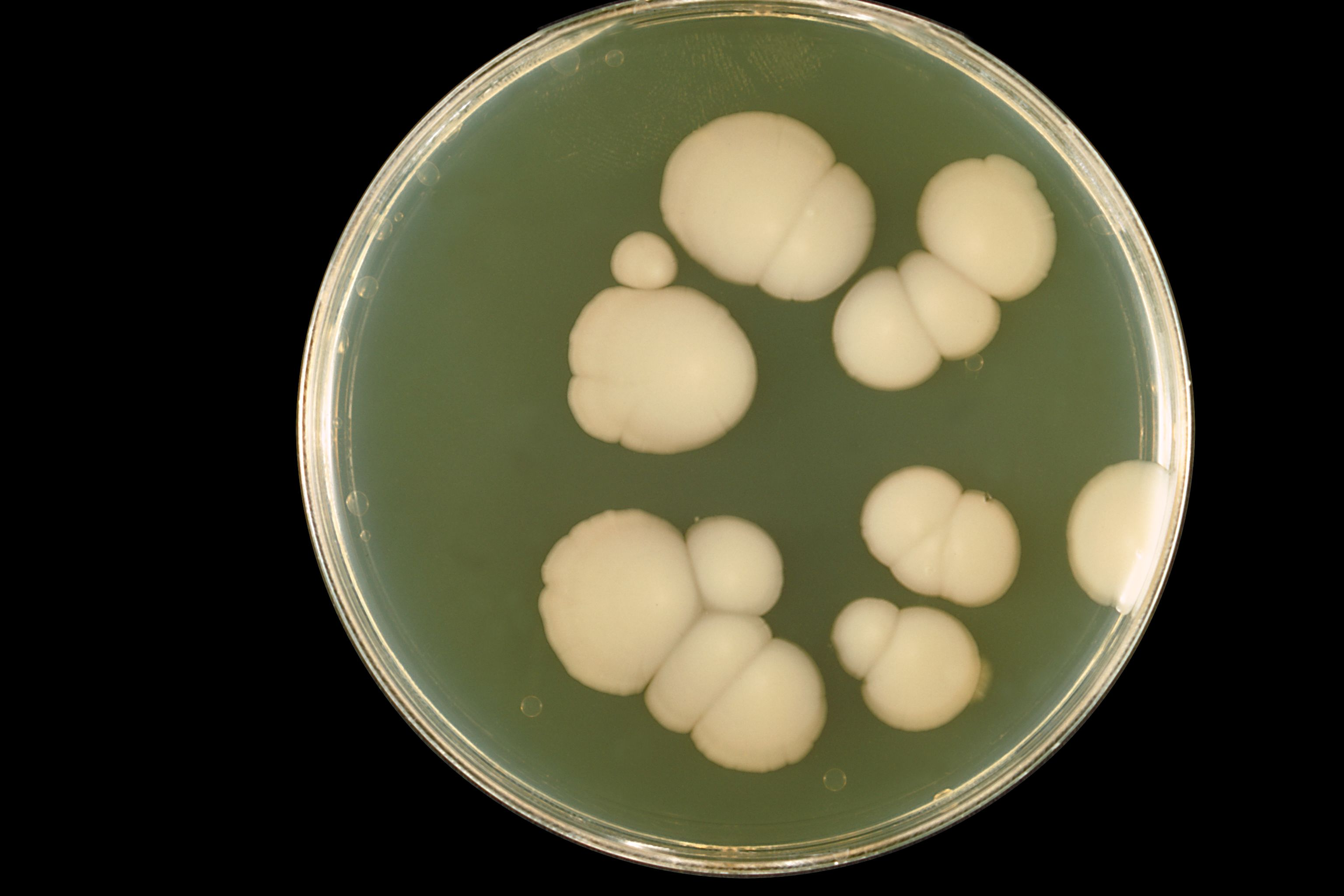
Candida albicans in Sabouraud agar

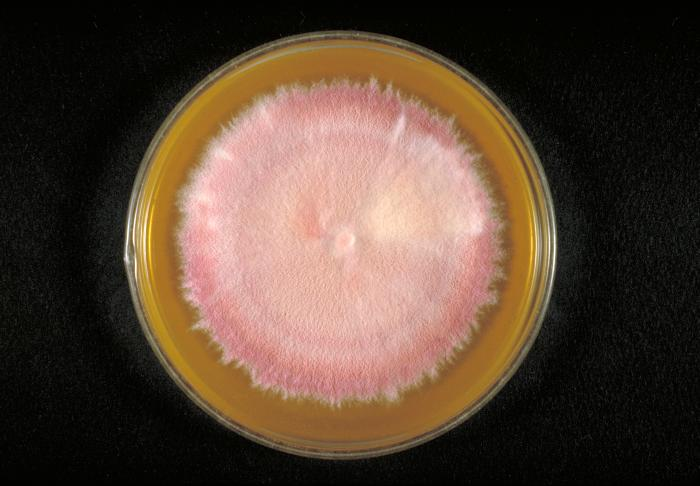
Trichophyton terrestre in Sabouraud agar

Sabouraud agar or Sabouraud dextrose agar (SDA) is a type of agar growth medium containing peptones. It is used to cultivate dermatophytes and other types of fungi, and can easily modified to grow actinobacteria such as Nocardia and Streptomyces.

It was created by, and is named after, the French scientist Raymond Sabouraud (1864-1938). In 1977, American infectious disease researcher Chester W. Emmons made adjustments to the formula, changing the pH level to be closer to neutral and reducing the concentration of dextrose to facilitate the growth of actinobacteria. Peptones are complex digests and can be a source of variability in Sabouraud agar.

== Typical composition ==
Sabouraud agar is commercially available and typically contains:

- 40 g/L dextrose
- 10 g/L soybean or bovine derived peptone digest
- 20 g/L agar
- acids to adjust batch to pH 5.6

== Medical use ==
Clinical laboratories can use this growth medium to diagnose and further speciate fungal infections, allowing medical professionals to provide appropriate treatment with antifungal medications. Histoplasma and other fungal causes of atypical pneumonia can be grown on this medium. Sabouraud agar used in combination with additional media, such as Inhibitory Mold Agar (IMA), improves identification of fungal clinical isolates.
