= Anthropophilia =

Parasitic preference for humans over other animals

In parasitology, anthropophilia, from the Greek ἅνθρωπος (anthrōpos, "human being") and φιλία (philia, "friendship" or "love"), is a preference of a parasite or dermatophyte for humans over other animals. The related term endophilia refers specifically to a preference for being in human habitats, especially inside dwellings. The term zoophilia, in this context, describes animals which prefer non-human animals for nourishment.

Most usage of the term anthropophilia refers to hematophagous insects (see Anopheles) that prefer human blood over animal blood (zoophily, but see other meanings of zoophily). Examples other than haematophagy include geckoes that live close to humans, pied crows (Corvus albus), cockroaches, and many others. In the study of malaria and its disease vectors, researchers make the distinction between anthropophilic mosquitoes and other types as part of disease eradication efforts.

Anthropic organisms are organisms that show anthropophily, where the adjective synanthropic refers to organisms that live close to human settlements and houses, and eusynanthropic to those that live within human housing.

== See also ==
- Human-animal breastfeeding
