= Zoophily =

Pollination by animals

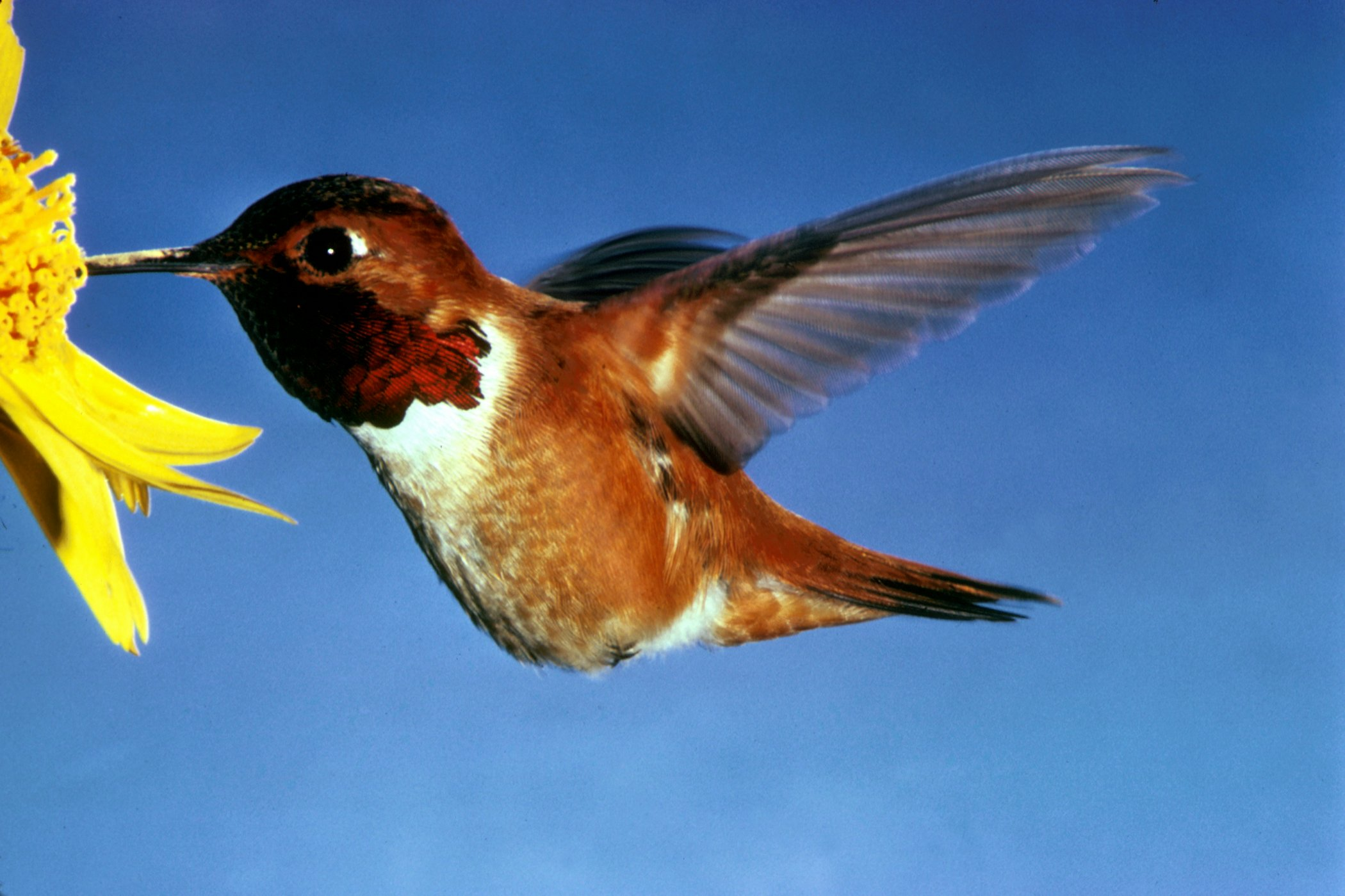
A rufous hummingbird (Selasphorus rufus) is attracted to brightly colored flowers and assists the pollination of the plant.

Zoophily, or zoogamy, is a form of pollination whereby pollen is transferred by animals, usually by invertebrates but in some cases vertebrates, particularly birds and bats, but also by other animals. Zoophilous species frequently have evolved mechanisms to make themselves more appealing to the particular type of pollinator, e.g., brightly colored or scented flowers, nectar, and appealing shapes and patterns. These plant-animal relationships are often mutually beneficial because of the food source provided in exchange for pollination.

Pollination is defined as the transfer of pollen from the anther to the stigma. There are many vectors for pollination, including abiotic (wind and water) and biotic (animal). There are benefits and costs associated with any vector. For instance, using animal pollination is beneficial because the process is more directed and often results in pollination. At the same time, it is costly for the plant to produce rewards, such as nectar, to attract animal pollinators. Not producing such rewards is one benefit of using abiotic pollinators, but a cost associated with this approach is that the pollen may be distributed more randomly. In general, pollination by animals occurs after they reach inside the flowers for nectar. While feeding on the nectar, the animal rubs or touches the stamens and is covered in pollen. Some of this pollen will be deposited on the stigma of the next flower it visits, pollinating the flower.

== Insect pollination ==
This is known as entomophily. There are many different subtypes.

=== Bee pollination (melittophily) ===
There are diverse types of bees (such as honeybees, bumblebees, and orchid bees), forming large groups that are quite distinctive in size, tongue length and behaviour (some solitary, some colonial); thus generalization about bee pollination is difficult. Some plants can only be pollinated by bees because their anthers release pollen internally, and it must be shaken out by buzz pollination (also known as "sonication"). Bees are the only animals that perform this behaviour. Bumblebees and solitary bees sonicate, but honeybees do not. About 9% of the flowers of the world are primarily pollinated using buzz pollination.

=== Wasp pollination ===
Wasps are also responsible for the pollination of several plants species, being important pollen vectors, and in some cases, even more efficient pollinators than bees.

=== Butterfly pollination (psychophily) ===
Despite their complete dependence on flowers for sustenance as imagoes, butterflies are generally poor pollinators, lacking specific structures to carry pollen. Nonetheless, some plants appear to have specialised on attracting butterflies. Buddleja is a well-known example. The species in the orchid genus Bonatea are all pollinated by moths, except for Bonatea cassidea which has evolved into a psychophile. This orchid affixes its pollinaria firmly between the palpi of visiting butterflies. Unlike its relatives, this orchid species exhibits diurnal anthesis, a weak scent which is virtually absent at night, and has short spurs containing small amounts of relatively dilute sucrose-rich nectar -these are all considered psychophilous traits. B. cassidea has white flowers, but butterfly-attracting flowers are often coloured. Unlike bees and wasps, some butterflies such as swallowtails are able to see the colour red. Butterflies also require a platform on which to land.

=== Moth pollination (phalaenophily) ===
Among the more important moth pollinators are the hawk moths (Sphingidae). Their behaviour is similar to hummingbirds: they hover in front of flowers with rapid wingbeats. Most are nocturnal or crepuscular.

Other moths (Noctuids, Geometrids, Pyralids, for example) fly slowly and settle on the flower. They do not require as much nectar as the fast-flying hawk moths, and the flowers tend to be small (though they may be aggregated in heads).

=== Fly pollination (myophily and sapromyophily) ===
Flies tend to be important pollinators in high-altitude and high-latitude systems, where they are numerous and other insect groups may be lacking. There are two main types of fly pollination: myophily and sapromyophily.

Myophily includes flies that feed on nectar and pollen as adults - particularly bee flies (Bombyliidae), hoverflies (Syrphidae), and others - and these regularly visit flowers. In contrast, male fruit flies (Tephritidae) are enticed by specific floral attractants emitted by some wild orchids which do not produce nectar. Chemicals emitted by the orchid act as the fly's sex pheromone precursor or booster.

Sapromyophiles, on the other hand, normally visit dead animals or dung. They are attracted to flowers which mimic the odor of such objects. The plant provides them with no reward and they leave quickly unless it has traps to slow them down. Such plants are far less common than myophilous ones.

=== Beetle pollination (cantharophily) ===
Beetles are particularly important in some parts of the world such as semi-arid areas of Southern Africa and southern California and the montane grasslands of KwaZulu-Natal in South Africa.

Cantharophily is often the main pollination system in the Araceae family. It occurs in genera such as Amorphophallus, Dieffenbachia, Monstera, Philodendron and Theriophonum. A well-known example is the gigantic inflorescence of Amorphophallus titanum. This bloom appears like column sticking out of a vast sheet of rotting flesh. It is able to generate heat, which it uses to exude a powerful foetid and revolting odour at night. This attracts necrophagous beetles, and also specialised beetle predators of these beetles -the plant is essentially tricking the beetles into believing that there is food or a place to lay their eggs. Araceae flowers often trap beetles in a compartment with the pollen: the beetles must pass through a constriction of the spathe to get inside, but the plant can tighten the spathe against the spadix and thus close the constriction for a time. There is also some evidence that the giant inflorescence, which heats itself to 36 °C, thus shines like an invisible infrared beacon in the dark of night on the jungle floor, unseen by humans but detectable by insects. The blooms of Philodendron adamantinum are able to stick a glob of resin on the otherwise smooth back of the beetles it attracts, modifying them so they are better equipped to carry pollen to the next inflorescence.

=== Other ===
In Dioscorea chouardii, pollination is performed by ants.

== Lizard pollination ==
According to one 2003 paper, it is possible that lizard pollination is underestimated. Lizards have been known to feed on nectar since 1977. However, only two species of lizard from New Zealand has been shown to carry pollen as of 2003, although it is unknown if they actually pollinate flowers. There is also circumstantial evidence Podarcis lilfordi may help pollinate Euphorbia dendroides on the Balearic Islands; one study found seed set higher in areas with a higher lizard density. Both these species are not dependant on nectar as a food source, and do not appear to have evolved specific adaptations to exploit it. Despite the lack of evidence, the authors nonetheless theorise that some plants on small islands may have mutualistically evolved to accommodate lizard pollination.

The lizards known to carry pollen are the geckoes Hoplodactylus duvauceli and Dactylocnemis pacificus. Between them, they visit the flowers of at least four species of plant: Metrosideros excelsa, Phormium tenax, Myoporum laetum and in one case Hebe bollonsii, although the structure of the flowers of the last three species do not allow pollen transfer to occur during feeding by lizards, which are better seen as robbers of nectar, these plants are adapted for bird or insect pollination. The only pollen ever found on these lizards is that of Metrosideros excelsa, which has been found on 3% to 47% of the lizards caught on these trees, depending on the night. These lizards are only attracted to the nectar on flowers, not the pollen. If it is proved that lizards are the main pollinators of these plants, the authors of the study theorise that the possible pollination syndrome associated with lizard pollination could be copious nectar and possibly scented flowers in the case of nocturnal lizards. Flowers or inflorescences must also be robust enough to support the weight of the pollinator while feeding. They also theorise that the colour red that the flowers of most species Metrosideros have, which generally attracts birds, might somehow also serve to repel insects and thus leave more nectar for the geckoes. Metrosideros excelsa is a generalist, which is pollinated by both birds and insects. There does not appear to be any mutualistic relationship between the geckoes and Metrosideros excelsa, neither species requires the presence of the other to thrive.

== Bird pollination ==
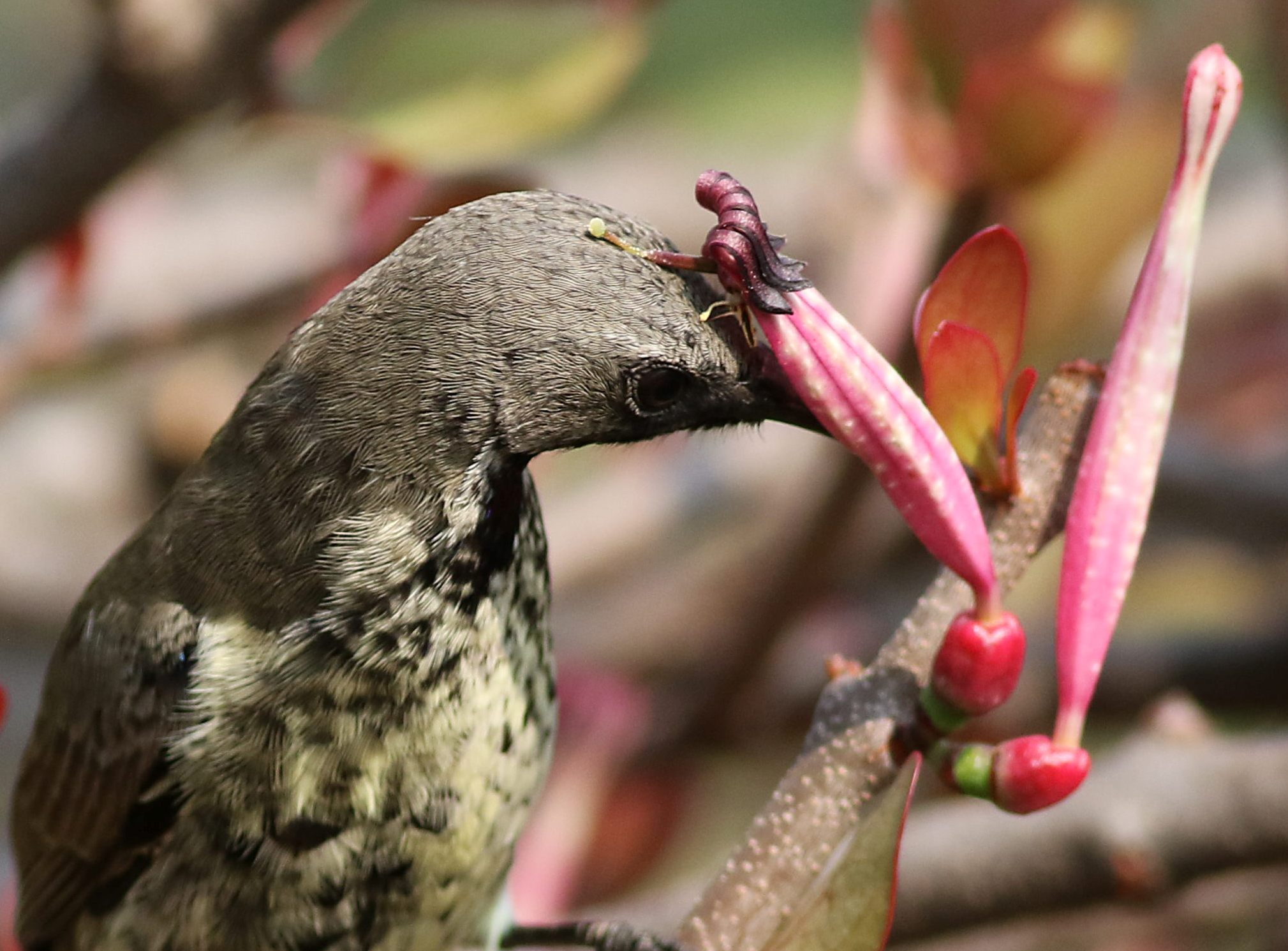
The pollen-laden anthers of a Tapinanthus mistletoe rub against the forecrown of a nectar-feeding amethyst sunbird.

The term ornithophily is used to describe pollination specifically by birds. Bird pollination is done primarily by bird species that specialize on eating nectar, which is known as nectarivory. Hummingbirds, found only in the Americas, and many other bird species throughout the world are obligate nectarivores and important pollinators. These include sunbirds, sugarbirds, honeyeaters, flowerpeckers and honeycreepers, these have long narrow bills suited for probing flowers. However, many shorter-billed birds can also pollinate, including white-eyes, bananaquits, flowerpiercers, lories and lorikeets, many of which have more generalist diets and also feed on insects, fruits, and seeds (short-billed birds can also steal nectar from long flowers, as suggested by the name 'flowerpiercer'). Hummingbirds are the oldest group of nectar-specialist birds, with the greatest degree of specialization on nectar. The trumpet creeper (Campsis radicans) is a plant species adapted specifically for hummingbirds.

Plants pollinated by birds often have elongated or tube-shaped, brightly colored diurnal flowers that are red or orange, but no odor because birds have a poor sense of smell.

Some 500 genera of plants are pollinated by birds.

== Bat pollination ==
Bat pollination is called chiropterophily. Hundreds of tropical plant species completely, or partially, dependent on bats for pollination in tropical regions. As of 2009, 28 orders, 67 families and about 528 species of angiosperms in some 250 genera are known to be pollinated by nectar-feeding bats. In some cases, nectivorous bats do not pollinate certain species, even while they do pollinate others; But instead act as 'nectar robbers' and exploit other pollination systems. Only two families of bats (not including the somewhat bizarre Mystacinidae) contain nectivores, and morphologically specialized nectivores are in the minority in both of these families, Pteropodidae (15 species) and Phyllostomidae (perhaps up to 38 species in the subfamily called Glossophaginae). Pteropodidae are large fruit bats from the Old World which must perch on the plant to access the nectar and do not have the ability to echolocate, whereas the much smaller Phyllostomidae only occur in the New World and have the ability to hover and echolocate.

Plants pollinated by bats often have white or pale nocturnal flowers that are large and bell shaped. Many of these flowers have large amounts of nectar, and emit a smell that attracts bats, such as a strong fruity or musky odor. Bats use certain chemical cues to locate food sources. They are attracted to odors that contain esters, alcohols, aldehydes, and aliphatic acids. Bats often have excellent spatial memory and will visit specific flowering plants repeatedly.

== Pollination by other mammals ==
Non-flying mammals (i.e. all mammals except bats) have been found to feed on the nectar of several species of plant. This is known as therophily. Though some of these mammals are pollinators, others do not carry or transfer enough pollen to be considered pollinators. The group of non-flying pollinators is composed of marsupials, lemurs, rodents, shrews, and elephant shrews. As of 1997 studies have documented non-flying mammal pollination involving at least 59 species of mammal distributed among 19 families and six orders. As of 1997, there were 85 species of plants from 43 genera and 19 families which were visited by these mammals. In many cases, a plant species is visited by a range of mammals. Two examples of multiple mammal pollination are the genus Quararibea which is visited by twelve species and Combretum which is visited by eight (although not all these animals actually pollinate the flowers).

The honey possum from southwestern Australia is the only entirely nectarivorous mammal which is not a bat.

One example of a plant using animal pollinators is the bulb Massonia depressa. At least four rodent species were found to be visiting M. depressa during the night. Traits of the M. depressa flowers support non-flying mammal pollination: it has a dull-colored and very sturdy inflorescence at ground level, has a strong yeasty odor, and secretes copious amounts of sucrose-dominant nectar during the night. The nectar of M. depressa was also found to be 400 times as viscous, i.e. sticky, as an equivalent sugar solution. This jelly-like consistency of the nectar may discourage insect consumption while also facilitating lapping by rodents.

It has been hypothesized that giraffes feeding on flowers of the knobthorn also act as pollinators. Its spicate inflorescences are too long to be protected by thorns and lack any chemical defenses, its flowers are pale rather than brightly colored as is typical of insect-pollinated species, and it blooms in the late dry season in September when other foods are less available. However, observed reductions in fruit set within feeding range of the giraffe suggest predation rather than pollination, with effective pollination more likely performed by insects or birds.

== See also ==
- Pollination syndrome
