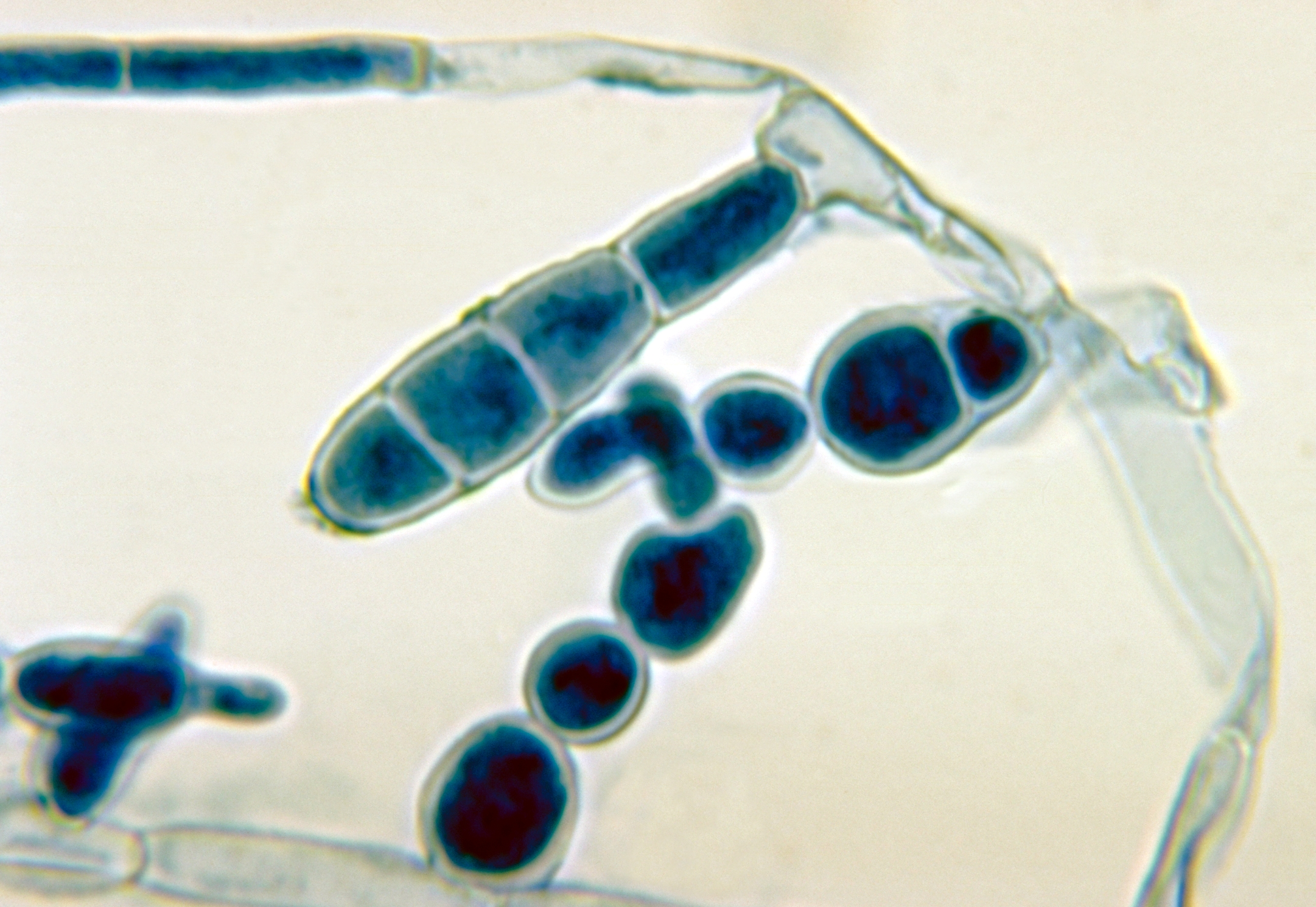
- Epidermophyton floccosum

Scientific classification
- Kingdom: Fungi
- Division: Ascomycota
- Class: Eurotiomycetes
- Order: Onygenales
- Family: Arthrodermataceae; Locq. ex Currah (1985)

Type genus
- Arthroderma Curr. (1860)

Genera
- Ctenomyces; Epidermophyton; Microsporum; Nannizzia; Trichophyton

= Arthrodermataceae =

Family of fungi

The Arthrodermataceae are a family of fungi containing nine dermatophyte genera — Epidermophyton, Microsporum, Nannizzia, Trichophyton, Paraphyton, Lophophyton, Guarromyces, Ctenomyces and Arthroderma.
