= Microsporum nanum =

Scientific classification
- Domain: Eukaryota
- Kingdom: Fungi
- Division: Ascomycota
- Class: Eurotiomycetes
- Order: Onygenales
- Family: Arthrodermataceae
- Genus: Microsporum
- Species: M. nanum

Binomial name
- Microsporum nanum C.A.Fuentes (1956)

Synonyms
- Microsporum gypseum var. nanum C.A.Fuentes, R.Aboulafia, R.J.Vidal (1954); Nannizzia obtusa C.O.Dawson, Gentles (1961); Arthroderma obtusum (C.O.Dawson & Gentles) Weitzman, McGinnis, A.A.Padhye & Ajello (1986)

Species of fungus

Microsporum nanum is a pathogenic fungus in the family Arthrodermataceae. It is a type of dermatophyte that causes infection in dead keratinized tissues such as skin, hair, and nails. Microsporum nanum is found worldwide and is both zoophilic and geophilic. Animals such as pigs and sheep are the natural hosts for the fungus; however, infection of humans is also possible. Majority of the human cases reported are associated with pig farming. The fungus can invade the skin of the host; if it is scratched off by the infected animal, the fungus is still capable of reproducing in soil.

When grown on Sabouraud's Dextrose agar at 25 °C, M. nanum produces a thin, powdery, and soft fibrous colony that appears white at the center becoming light yellowish-brown towards the colony margin. The reverse side appears brownish-orange in young colony and reddish-brown in older colony. The mitochondrial genome of M. nanum consists of 15 protein-coding genes, 2 rRNAs, 25 tRNAs, one intron and one intronic ORF. Approximately 84% of the mitochondrial genome are the structural genes. Microsporum nanum infections include tinea capitis, tinea corporis, tinea cruris, and tinea faciei. Griseofulvin, clotrimazole, miconazole, enilconazole and many herbal treatments, such as extracts from Azadirachta indica, essential oil from Curcuma longa and Eucalyptus pauciflora have been reported to be effective in inhibiting the fungus.

== Taxonomy and naming ==
Microsporum nanum was first thought to be a variant of M. gypseum by Fuentes, Aboulafia, and Vidal who named it M. gypseum var. nanum in 1954. Significant morphological differences between the macroconidia of M. gypseum var. nanum and M. gypseum var. gypseum prompted Fuentes to elevate the former to the species-level as M. nanum two years later. The sexual reproductive (teleomorph) stage of M. nanum was first described by Dawson and Gentles as Nannizzia obtusa in 1961 who isolated it from skin lesions in pigs in Kenya. The name was changed to Arthroderma obtusum by Weitzman, McGinnis, Padhye and Ajello in 1986.

== Description ==
Microsporum nanum is a mesophile and grows moderately rapid on Sabouraud's Dextrose agar. Its macroconidia are ovoid in shape and, unlike those of most other species of Microsporum, normally consist of no more than three cells. Rare to moderate numbers of rough-walled microconidia can also be found in the colony. Microsporum nanum grows optimally at 25 °C but is capable of growth at temperatures up to 37 °C. Physiological tests have shown that M. nanum does not require vitamin supplementation for its growth. Like many other dermatophytes, M. nanum is tolerant of the antifungal agent cycloheximide. In addition, M. nanum also exhibits soil association characters such as urease activity and the formation of perforating organ on hair shafts.

== Mitochondrial genome ==
Mitochondrial DNA sequences have been used for phylogenetic studies in the dermatophytes. A typical fungal mitochondrial DNA usually contains 14 conserved protein-coding genes, 22 to 26 tRNA gene, and 2 rRNA genes. The difference of mitochondrial DNA between fungal species is due to the variations in intergenic region, intron, and gene order. The complete sequences of Trichophyton rubrum, T. mentagrophytes, T. ajelloi, M. canis, M. nanum, and Epidermophyton floccosum show that these 6 species in dermatophytes are closely related because their mitochondrial genomes are highly conserved. Genome size of mitochondrial DNA in M. nanum is 24,105 basepairs. The DNA is AT-rich and the GC content is only 24.47%. M. nanum mtDNA has 15 protein-coding genes, including ATP synthase subunits atp6, atp8, and atp9, cytochrome oxidase subunits cox1, cox2, and cox3, apocytochrome b cob, a ribosomal protein rps5, and NADH dehydrogenase subunits nad1, nad2, nad3, nad4, nad5, and nad6. The gene order of the 15 conserved protein coding genes in M. nanum mtDNA is identical to that of T. rubrum, T. mentagrophytes, T. ajelloi, and M. canis. The Microsporum nanum mtDNA also contains 2 rRNAs and 25 tRNAs. In addition, this mitochondrial genome is highly compact because 83.76% are structural genes. Moreover, the genome contains one intron and one intronic ORF.

== Distribution ==
The distribution of M. nanum is worldwide, including North and South Americas, Canada, Europe, the Middle East, Australia, and Asia. Microsporum nanum and several other dermatophytes were isolated from eleven soil samples of hospitals and public places at Gulbarga, India. Keratinous wastes such as human dander and feathers of birds were suspected to provide a growth medium for these keratinophilic fungi. Microscporum nanum was observed much more frequently in hospital soil than in public places; the percentage was 45.4% and 33.3% of the total number of the observed keratinophilic fungi respectively.

== Pathogenicity ==
Microsporum nanum is geophilic and zoophilic. There are records of isolation from both pig farm soil and the infected pigs. Like M. canis, M. audouinii, and M. ferrugineum, M. nanum causes ectothrix infection. Its growth is usually stops at the keratinized layer of the skin. However, there is some literature suggesting that Microsporum nanum may form endothrix infection under certain circumstances. Unlike other species of Microsporum, Wood's Light Examinationof the skin yields inconsistent findings and fluorescence may or may not be observed.

At the keratinized layer, M. nanum secretes many metabolic products, which trigger inflammation and result in chronic inflammatory infection in swine. The skin lesions are characterized by large brownish spots. Moreover, the infections are also found in cattle, dogs, mice, guinea pigs, and rabbits. Although uncommon, it is known to cause infection in humans following contact with infected animals or contaminated soil. Examples of some common human diseases caused by Microsporum nanum including tinea capitis, tinea corporis, tinea cruris, and tinea faciei. Symptoms might include erythematous papular rash with scaling or inflamed patches on skin. Since M. nanum is only associated with mild, readily-treatable human disease, it is classified at Biosafety Level 2 in many jurisdictions.

=== Treatment ===
Griseofulvin, clotrimazole, and miconazole are antimycotic agents that are used to treat M. nanum and T. rubrum. Of three human cases of M. nanum infection reported in 1986, all resolved with treatments by griseofulvin, clotrimazole or miconazole cream. Enilconazole is a fungicide that can be used as veterinary medicine. 0.2% of enilconazole in tap water was reported to be effective in clearing M. nanum in infected sows.

==== Plant extracts ====
Azadirachta indica

Azadirachta indica, also known as neem, is used as an antifungal treatment against many dermatophytes such as M. nanum. It is known for its immunomodulatory, anti-inflammatory, antihyperglycemic, antiulcer, antimalarial, antibacterial, antioxidant, antimutagenic and anticarcinogenic activities. Both neem seed and neem leaves are capable of killing M. nanum. The minimum inhibitory concentration (MIC) of seed extract was lower than that of leaf extract when treating M. nanum and other dermatophytes, which were 31 and 15 μg/mL respectively. The application of the neem extract significantly inhibits the growth of the treated dermatophytes when compared with the control (untreated fungi).

Curcuma longa L.

The Curcuma longa L. is a perennial herb, which belongs to the ginger family, Zingiberaceae. The essential oil from the leaves of the herb is effective in treating many pathogenic fungi, such as Epidermophyton floccosum, M. gypseum, M. nanum, T. mentagrophytes, T. rubrum, and T. violaceum. The essential oil is mainly composed of 26.4% terpinolene, 8% α-phellandrene, 7.4% terpinen-4-ol, and 3.2% sabinyl acetate. The oil is fungistatic and fungicidal to Microsporum nanum at concentrations of 2.0 and 2.5 μL/mL respectively. The treatment completely inhibits the mycelia growth of the ringworm caused by Microsporum nanum, Epidermophyton floccosum, Trichophyton rubrum, and Trichophyton violaceum. No adverse effect is reported yet. In addition, the juice from the rhizome of Curcuma longa also be used to treat skin infections, indolent ulcers, inflamed joints, and in purulent ophthalmia.

Eucalyptus pauciflora

Eucalyptus pauciflora, commonly known as snow gum, is a flowering plant that grows in eastern Australia. The essential oil from Eucalyptus pauciflora has a strong antifungal activity. It is fungicidal to M. nanum, E. floccosum, M. audouinii, M. canis, M. gypseum, T. mentagrophytes, T. rubrum, T. tonsurans, and T. violaceum at a concentration of 1.0 μL/mL. No adverse effects on mammalian skin have been reported.
