= List of types of tinea =

Tinea
- Other names: Ringworm
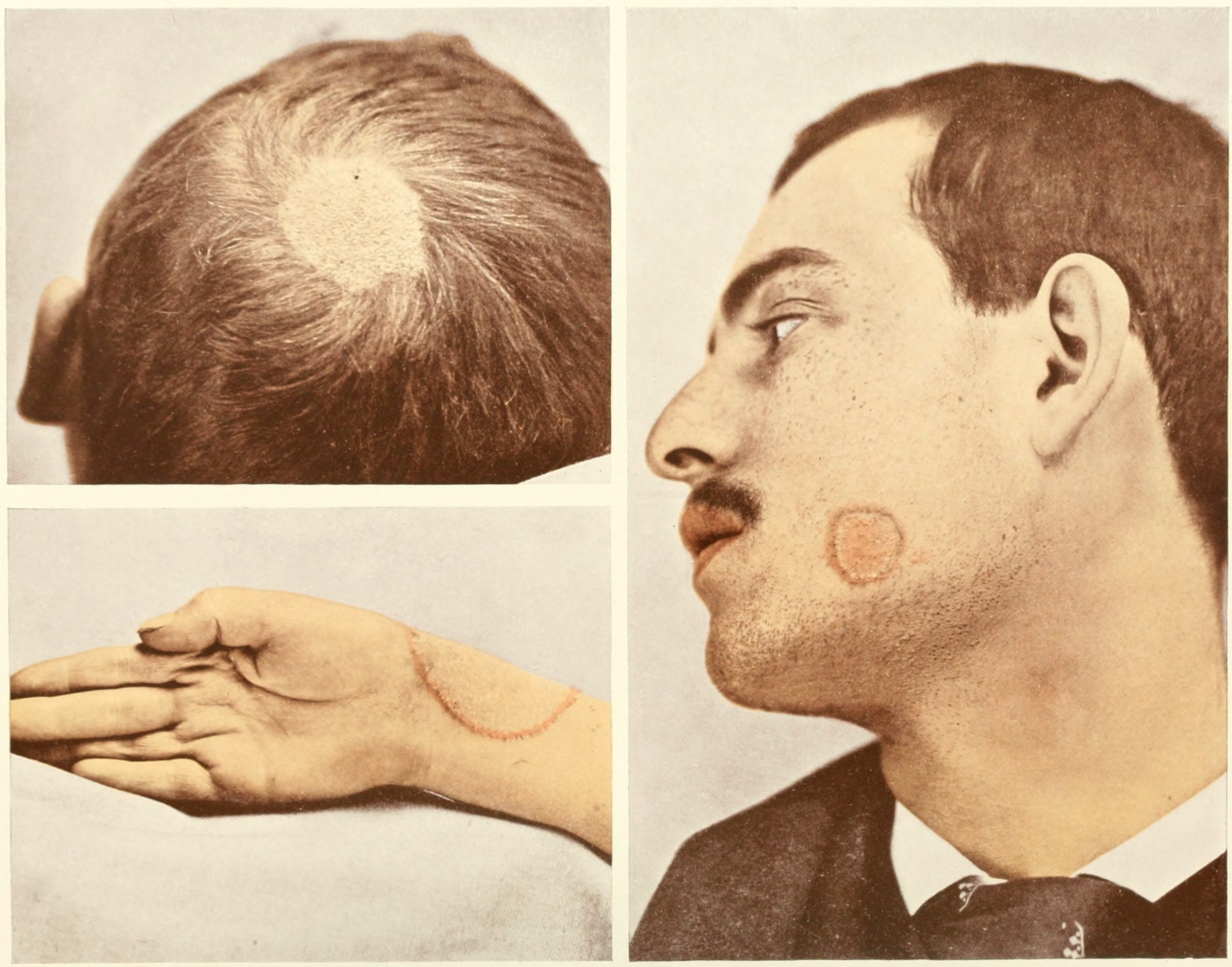
- Tinea in various locations
- Specialty: Infectious disease, dermatology

Tinea or ringworm is any of a variety of skin mycoses. Tinea is a very common fungal infection of the skin. Tinea is often called "ringworm" because the rash is circular, with a ring-like appearance.

It is sometimes equated with dermatophytosis, and, while most conditions identified as "tinea" are members of the imperfect fungi that make up the dermatophytes, conditions such as tinea nigra and tinea versicolor are not caused by dermatophytes.

== Tinea pedis (foot) ==
Athlete's foot (also known as "ringworm of the foot", tinea pedum, and "moccasin foot") is a common and contagious skin disease that causes itching, scaling, flaking, and sometimes blistering of the affected areas. Its medical name is tinea pedis, a member of the group of diseases or conditions known as tinea, most of which are dermatophytoses (fungal infections of the skin), which in turn are mycoses (broad category of fungal infections). Globally, athlete's foot affects about 15% of the population.

Tinea pedis is caused by fungi such as Epidermophyton floccosum or fungi of the genus Trichophyton including T. rubrum and T. mentagrophytes. These fungi are typically transmitted in moist communal areas where people go barefoot, such as around swimming pools or in showers, and require a warm moist environment like the inside of a shoe to incubate. Fungal infection of the foot may be acquired (or reacquired) in many ways, such as by walking in an infected locker room, by using an infested bathtub, by sharing a towel used by someone with the disease, by touching the feet with infected fingers (such as after scratching another infected area of the body), or by wearing fungi-contaminated socks or shoes.

Infection can often be prevented by keeping the feet dry by limiting the use of footwear that enclose the feet, or by remaining barefoot.

The fungi may infect or spread to other areas of the body (such as by scratching one's feet and then touching one's groin). For each location on the body, the name of the condition changes. A fungal infection of the groin is called Tinea cruris, or commonly "jock itch". The fungi tend to spread to areas of skin that are kept warm and moist, such as with insulation (clothes), body heat, and sweat.

However, the spread of the infection is not limited to skin. Toe nails become infected with fungi in the same way as the rest of the foot, typically by being trapped with fungi in the warm, dark, moist inside of a shoe. Fungal infection of the nails is called tinea unguium, and is not included in the medical definition of "athlete's foot", even though toe nails are part of the foot. Fungi are more difficult to kill inside and underneath a nail than on and in the skin. But if the nail infection is not cured, then the fungi can readily spread back to the rest of the foot. The fungi can also spread to hair, grow inside hair strands, and feed on the keratin within hair, including the hair on the feet, the hair of one's beard, and the hair on one's head. From hair, the fungi can spread back to skin.

To effectively treat athlete's foot, it is necessary to treat the entire infection, wherever it is on the body, until the fungi are dead and the skin has fully healed. There is a wide array of over the counter and prescription topical medications in the form of liquids, sprays, powders, ointments, and creams for killing fungi that have infected the feet or the body in general. For persistent conditions, oral medications are available by prescription.

== Tinea unguium (nails) ==
Onychomycosis (also known as "dermatophytic onychomycosis", or "tinea unguium" is a fungal infection of the nail. It is the most common disease of the nails and constitutes about half of all nail abnormalities.

This condition may affect toenails or fingernails, but toenail infections are particularly common. It occurs in about 10% of the adult population.

== Tinea manuum (hand) ==
Tinea manuum (or tinea manus) is a fungal infection of the hand. It is typically more aggressive than tinea pedis but similar in look. Itching, burning, cracking, and scaling are observable and may be transmitted sexually or otherwise, whether or not symptoms are present.

== Tinea cruris (groin) ==
Tinea cruris, also known as "crotch itch", "crotch rot", "Dhobie itch", "eczema marginatum", "gym itch", "jock itch", "jock rot", "scrot rot" and "ringworm of the groin" is a dermatophyte fungal infection of the groin region in any sex, though more often seen in males. In the German sprachraum this condition is called tinea inguinalis (from Latin inguen = groin) whereas tinea cruris is used for a dermatophytosis of the lower leg (Latin crus).

Tinea cruris is similar to Candidal intertrigo, which is an infection of the skin by Candida albicans. It is more specifically located between intertriginous folds of adjacent skin, which can be present in the groin or scrotum, and be indistinguishable from fungal infections caused by tinia. However, candidal infections tend to both appear and disappear with treatment more quickly. It may also affect the scrotum.

== Tinea corporis (body) ==
Tinea corporis (also known as "ringworm", tinea circinata, and tinea glabrosa) is a superficial fungal infection (dermatophytosis) of the arms and legs, especially on glabrous skin; however, it may occur on any part of the body, it present as annular, marginated plaque with thin scale and clear center. Common organism are Trichophyton mentagrophytes and Micosporum canis. Treatments include grisofluvine, itraconazole and clotrimazole cream.

== Tinea capitis (scalp) ==
Tinea capitis (also known as "Herpes tonsurans", "Ringworm of the hair", "Ringworm of the scalp", "Scalp ringworm", and "Tinea tonsurans") is a superficial fungal infection (dermatophytosis) of the scalp. The disease is primarily caused by dermatophytes of the genera Trichophyton and Microsporum that invade the hair shaft. The clinical presentation is typically single or multiple patches of hair loss, sometimes with a 'black dot' pattern (often with broken-off hairs), that may be accompanied by inflammation, scaling, pustules, and itching. Uncommon in adults, tinea capitis is predominantly seen in pre-pubertal children, more often boys than girls.

At least eight species of dermatophytes are associated with tinea capitis. Cases of Trichophyton infection predominate from Central America to the United States and in parts of Western Europe. Infections from Microsporum species are mainly in South America, Southern and Central Europe, Africa and the Middle East. The disease is infectious and can be transmitted by humans, animals, or objects that harbor the fungus. The fungus can also exist in a carrier state on the scalp, without clinical symptomatology. Treatment of tinea capitis requires an oral antifungal agent; griseofulvin is the most commonly used drug, but other newer antimycotic drugs, such as terbinafine, itraconazole, and fluconazole have started to gain acceptance, topical treatment include selenium sulfide shampoo.

== Tinea faciei (face) ==
Tinea faciei is a fungal infection of the face.

It generally appears as a red rash on the face, followed by patches of small, raised bumps. The skin may peel while it is being treated.

Tinea faciei is contagious just by touch and can spread easily to all regions of skin.

== Tinea barbae (beard) ==
Tinea barbæ (also known as "Barber's itch", "Ringworm of the beard", and "Tinea sycosis") is a fungal infection of the hair. Tinea barbae is due to a dermatophytic infection around the bearded area of men. Generally, the infection occurs as a follicular inflammation, or as a cutaneous granulomatous lesion, i.e. a chronic inflammatory reaction. It is one of the causes of folliculitis. It is most common among agricultural workers, as the transmission is more common from animal-to-human than human-to-human. The most common causes are Trichophyton mentagrophytes and T. verrucosum.

== Tinea imbricata (overlapping pattern) ==
Tinea imbricata (also known as "Tokelau") is a superficial fungal infection of the skin limited to southwest Polynesia, Melanesia, Southeast Asia, India, and Central America.

It is associated with Trichophyton concentricum.

== Tinea nigra (black) ==
Tinea nigra (also known as "superficial phaeohyphomycosis", and "Tinea nigra palmaris et plantaris") is a superficial fungal infection that causes dark brown to black painless patches on the palms of the hands and the soles of the feet.

== Tinea versicolor (various colors) ==
Tinea versicolor (also known as dermatomycosis furfuracea, pityriasis versicolor, and tinea flava) is a condition characterized by a skin eruption on the trunk and proximal extremities, hypopigmentation macule in area of sun induced pigmentation. During the winter the pigment becomes reddish brown. Recent research has shown that the majority of tinea versicolor is caused by the Malassezia globosa fungus, although Malassezia furfur is responsible for a small number of cases. These yeasts are normally found on the human skin and only become troublesome under certain circumstances, such as a warm and humid environment, although the exact conditions that cause initiation of the disease process are poorly understood. Treatment include [griseofulivin], topical selenium shampoo and topical ketoconazole.

The condition pityriasis versicolor was first identified in 1846. Versicolor comes from the Latin, from versāre to turn + color.

== Tinea incognito (disguised) ==
Tinea incognito is a fungal infection (mycosis) of the skin caused by the presence of a topical immunosuppressive agent. The usual agent is a topical corticosteroid (topical steroid). As the skin fungal infection has lost some of the characteristic features due to suppression of inflammation, it may have a poorly defined border, skin atrophy, telangiectasia, and florid growth. Occasionally, secondary infection with bacteria occurs with concurrent pustules and impetigo.

== Tinea genitalis (genitals) ==
Tinea genitalis is a superficial fungal skin infection of the genitals (penis, scrotum, vulva, etc.), which is distinct from but may coincide with infection of the groin (tinea cruris, "jock itch"). Tinea genitalis has been found to be spread through sexual contact, including the emerging sexually transmitted infection Trichophyton mentagrophytes type VII (TMVII).

== See also ==
- Skin infections and wrestling
