= Microsporum fulvum =

Scientific classification
- Domain: Eukaryota
- Kingdom: Fungi
- Division: Ascomycota
- Class: Eurotiomycetes
- Order: Onygenales
- Family: Arthrodermataceae
- Genus: Microsporum
- Species: M. fulvum

Binomial name
- Microsporum fulvum Uriburu (1909)

Synonyms
- Closterosporia fulva Grigoraki (1925); Sabouraudites fulvis M Ota & Langeron (1923)

Species of fungus

Microsporum fulvum is a wildly-distributed dermatophyte species in the Fungi Kingdom. It is known to be a close relative to other dermatophytes such as Trichophyton and Epidermophyton. The fungus is common within soil environments and grows well on keratinized material, such as hair, nails and dead skin. It is recognized as an opportunistic fungal pathogen capable of causing cutaneous mycoses in humans and animals. Originally, the fungus was thought to be Microsporum gypseum until enhanced genetic examination separated the two as distinct species in 1963.

== History and taxonomy ==
Microsporum fulvum was first documented in 1909 as Microsporum gypseum by Weitzman et al. (Argentina Medical Society). The fungus was thought to be the imperfect state of the anamorphic, asexually reproducing, M. gypseum. However, in Stockdale (1963) M. fulvum was considered and described as its own species, Nannizzia fulva, the perfect state of the fungus. In the present, M. fulvum is still referred to as part of the Microsporum gypseum complex. This complex includes the three distinct species: Microsporum gypseum, Microsporum fulvum and Microsporum incurvatum. Each of these fungi possess a high degree of morphological similarity but do have significant genetic differences accounting for the speciation.

== Growth ==
Microsporum fulvum will grow well on soil in a wide-variety of climate conditions and is found in world-wide distribution. The fungus tends to colonize keratin-rich environments and will grow rapidly in culture or in nature at diverse temperatures. M. fulvum commonly occupies materials such as dead skin cells and fragmented hair filaments. In culture, growth will occur within 4–5 days and forms floccose, wooly colonies. The clustered cells appear granular with a sandy-brown tinge where most compact and a less dense, whiter periphery.

=== Morphology ===
M. fulvum looks morphologically similar to Microsporum gypseum. The fungus propagates sexually reproductive asci that are 5-7 microns large with up to 8 spores, which are densely packed with ascospores. Asexual macroconidia are also formed and appear in large clusters (up to 8 microns in diameter) with hyphae branches. The macroconidia are fusoid-shaped with tapered ends and have very thin walls. Microconidia are drop-shaped and are observed with sparse, irregular hyphae. When grown on soil combined with horse hair, closed fruiting bodies called cleistothecia form.

=== Reproduction ===
Microsporum fulvum is classified as a teleomorphic species as it sexually reproduces. This sexual state has been referred to as Arthroderma fulvum. Two mating types have been distinguished for the sexual reproduction of the fungus and are characterized with (+) and (-). The (+) mating type synthesizes the elastase enzyme, where as the (-) mating type is unable to produce the elastase. Experiments involving the mating types suggest that the (+) mating type has higher virulence and causes more cases of infection. However, both strains demonstrate a positive result for their ability to hydrolyze the urea molecule, indicating the presence of the urease enzyme. A conducted study showed that a majority of tested isolates (>50%) of M. fulvum tested positive for urea hydrolysis within 0–7 days, and almost all isolates tested positive within 10–12 days, suggesting rapid growth of the organism.

== Habitat and ecology ==
Like many other dermatophytes, M. fulvum is a soil-loving, geophilic organism. The species is commonly found invading obsolete hair fibres and skin molecules which are made of keratin proteins. It can be found growing on the keratinized material of many different mammalian species including humans, horses, rodents, dogs, etc. without perceived preference. However, a higher incidence of colonization of M. fulvum has been documented on the epidermis of hedgehogs without causing any serious skin lesions, suggesting a commensal relationship between the organisms. Isolates of the fungus have been found in skin and lung samples of healthy rodents without indication of impairment. As well, other Microsporum species have arthrospores that are known to remain on human scalp hairs for months without causing skin lesions. Due to the similar behavioural description of species in the Microsporum genus, it is believed that penetration of the mucous membrane is necessary for the fungus to become infectious to the host, otherwise the fungal organism can coexist without harm.

Geographically, Microporum fulvum has been found in diverse climate regions world-wide. The distribution of the fungus seems to be very broad and indiscriminate to temperature fluctuations. Isolates have been documented in Germany, Spain, France, Gabon, Iran and many more geographically distinct areas. The fungus is commonly isolated in Canadian soils, however few infections have been reported. After a 20-year-old man in Iran was diagnosed with a M. fulvum fungal infection, a study was conducted on Iranian soil cultures from regions of varying temperatures. Experiments concluded that M. fulvum is colonized in the soils of a wide variety of environmental regions.

== Detection ==
A mechanism termed baiting can be used to attract Microsporum fulvum to specific soil samples. The method involves preparing the desired soil with keratinized molecules (hair fragments, nail clippings, etc.) and waiting for colonization of fungus onto the material. Once fungal collections populate the sample, morphological examination can be conducted and completed. Morphological analysis is used to distinguish Microsporum species from other keratin-loving dermatophytes. To accurately decipher Microsporum gypseum and Microsporum fulvum from one another, many researchers use genetic analysis procedures. PCR amplification and genetic testing can be used to uncover information about the mitochondrial DNA, which differs between the two species. In clinical reports, researchers have used methods referred to as Internal Transcribed Spacer (ITS) Sequencing and Matrix-assisted laser desorption/ionization (Maldi-TOF) Mass Spectrometry to differentiate the species of the Microsporum gypseum complex.

== Disease ==
=== Pathogenicity ===
Microsporum fulvum causes infection in humans, similar to the ringworm infection caused by Microsporum gypseum that can lead to disease progression. M. fulvum has been reported in cases of dermatophytosis, cutaneous mycoses on any keratinized tissue (dead skin). Tinea corporis refers to the generic ringworm infection that can occur on any area of the body. Tinea pedis is commonly referred to as Athlete's Foot and involves Microsporum fungi infecting the feet. Tinea capitis refers to Microsporum fungi infection of the scalp. Each of these can be caused by Microsporum fulvum, as well as other fungi, and elicit a similar immune response leading to dry patches, rashes, redness, edema, etc. in a localized area. Research shows that most infections from M. fulvum will have a duration of approximately one month and regress on their own, with the exception of more severe cases that require treatment.

These mycoses are restricted to keratinized tissue and remain localized as non-systemic infections. The causative agent of disease are fungal keratinases, which degrade dead material and break down tissue. However, defense mechanisms are present within mammalian blood serum that inhibit these molecules and do not allow the fungus to travel throughout the body in the circulatory system. If the fungus gains access to mucosal membranes, it begins to release the elastase enzyme as well, which is responsible for causing an inflammatory response in the host.

=== Transmission ===
Initial infections with Microsporum fulvum are most likely from indirect sources where the fungus inhabited soil that came into contact with the mucous membrane of an animal. New infections can arise through direct or indirect contact of animals and humans who have been introduced to another contaminated source. Often transmission involves the shared use of clothing (shoes- tinea pedis, hats- capitis, etc.). Incidence of infection cases increase in winter months with cold climates due to continued use of closed-toed footwear which provide a good environment for fungal growth. Symptoms of infection are also exacerbated and more severe in these conditions.

Initial infections are common in those with high contact to soil and plant material, such as gardeners. Secondary contamination of M. fulvum often occurs in bursts with multiple infections. In 1949, there were 8 cases of microsporosis caused by M. fulvum that were all in children under the age of 10 who lived in the same neighbourhood of Indiana. Thus, the fungus can spread through contact transmission.

=== Treatment and prevention ===
Due to the biological properties and transmission methods of M. fulvum, proper hygienic practices assist with prevention of infection, especially regarding tinea pedis (infection of the feet). Health officials recommend the avoidance of contaminated flooring, such as locker rooms where fungi grow rapidly.

In past reports, treatment methods for Microsporum gypseum infections have been effective for M. fulvum infections. Anti-fungal drugs may be prescribed. As few infections have been confirmed to be caused by M. fulvum, little data has become available on treatment options. However, one confirmed infection in an Iranian man had been treated with oral terbinafine (antifungal drug) and the infection cleared.

== Biotechnology applications ==
Keratinase is an enzyme that functions to break down and degrade keratin molecules. Microsporum fulvum has the ability to synthesize keratinase and utilize the enzyme to inhabit and exploit the environment in which it resides. Poultry industries have become interested in organisms which intrinsically produce keratinase for the reasoning that chicken feathers, which have high levels of dense keratin, are tough to break down and utilize. Fungal keratinase could be cultivated to break down chicken feathers into smaller products which could be converted into other material, such as animal feed.
