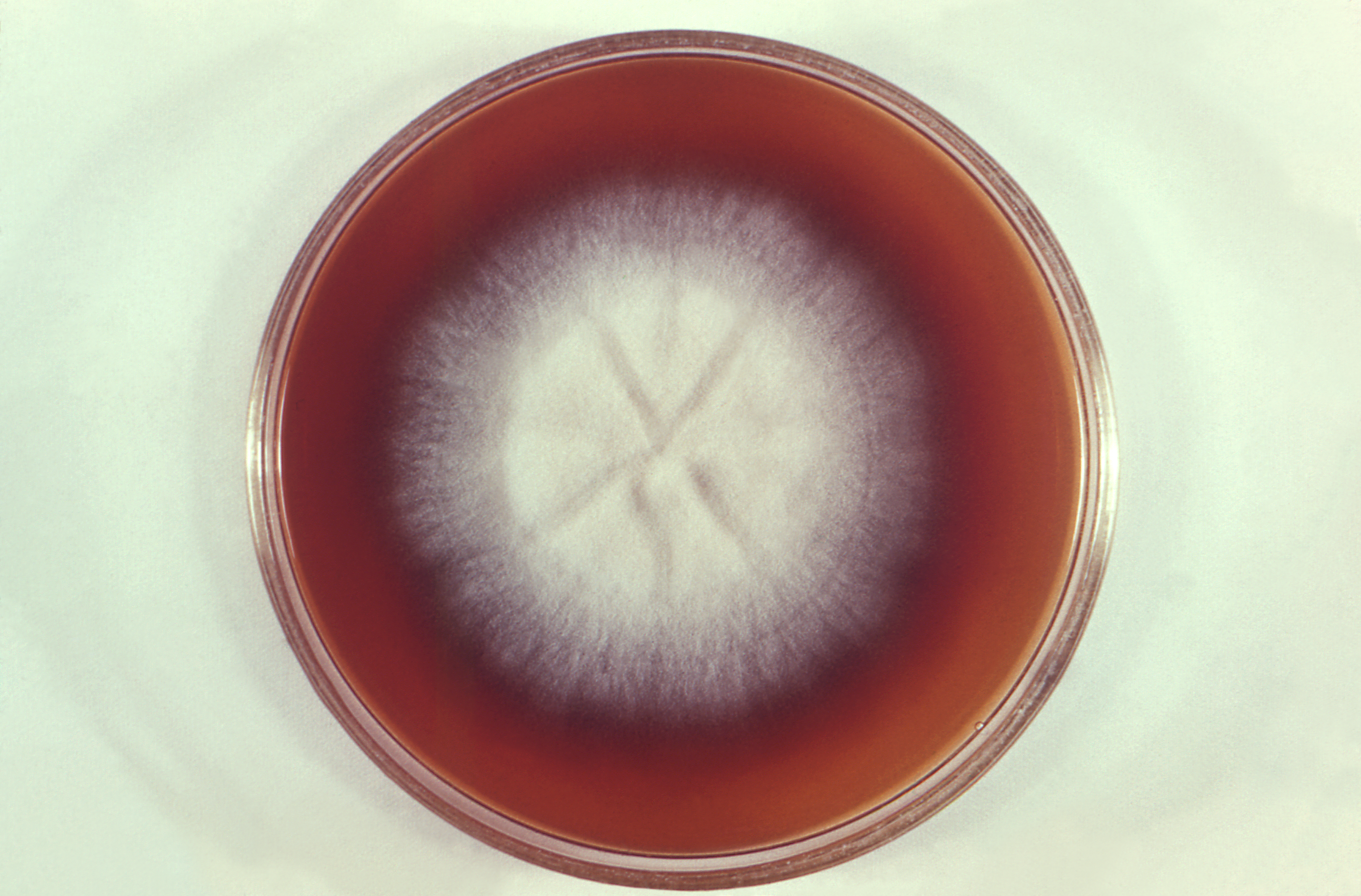
- Microsporum gallinae colony growing in petri dish

Scientific classification
- Domain: Eukaryota
- Kingdom: Fungi
- Division: Ascomycota
- Class: Eurotiomycetes
- Order: Onygenales
- Family: Arthrodermataceae
- Genus: Microsporum
- Species: M. gallinae

Binomial name
- Microsporum gallinae (Mégnin ex Guéguen) Grigorakis (1929)

Synonyms
- Epidermophyton gallinae Mégnin (1881); Trichophyton gallinae (Mégnin ex Guéguen) Georg (1952)

= Microsporum gallinae =

Species of fungus

Microsporum gallinae is a fungus of the genus Microsporum that causes dermatophytosis, commonly known as ringworm. Chickens represent the host population of Microsporum gallinae but its opportunistic nature allows it to enter other populations of fowl, mice, squirrels, cats, dogs and monkeys. Human cases of M. gallinae are rare, and usually mild, non-life-threatening superficial infections.

== Taxonomy and naming ==
Microsporum gallinae was first identified in 1881 by Megnin from chicken favus, and named Epidermophyton gallinae. It was later transferred from the Epidermophyton genus, and classified in the Trichophyton genus, as T. gallinae.

The identification of rough-walled macroconidia, a hallmark of the Microsporum genus, lead to the dermatophyte being classified as M. gallinae. There is still debate about the phylogenetic placement of this dermatophyte, but the accepted name is Microsporum gallinae. Analysis of its DNA sequences by PCR shows M. gallinae is most closely related to Microsporum vanbreuseghemii and Arthroderma grubyi, both are also zoophilic fungi.

== Distribution ==
Microsporum gallinae is distributed throughout the world, with cases reported in: Europe, the Middle East, South America, North America, Africa and Japan. The fungus seems to be isolated more often in areas with high humidity and temperature.

== Morphology ==
In culture, M. gallinae produces a white, satiny colony. The colony appears flat with radial folds and irregular edges as it grows in culture The colony reverse produces a strong pigmentation that changes from pink to a deep red and diffuses through the growth medium. Optimal growth of M. gallinae occurs at 26-28 °C, and no special nutritional requirements are necessary for its growth. Additionally, M. gallinae is urease positive.

During sporulation, septate hyphae, with macroconidia with tappered tips, and club shaped microconidia are present. The addition of thiamine or yeast extracts promotes sporulation of M. gallinae. Hair invasion observed in M. gallinae is large spored ectothrix type, meaning that the spores form outside of the hair shaft.

== Pathogenicity ==
Microsporum gallinae is a cosmopolitan zoophilic fungi that very rarely affects humans. It obtains nutrients from keratin-rich skin, nails and hair, releasing enzymes during its digestion that elicit a host immune response as seen in ringworm. Microsporum gallinae infection is diagnosed by culturing the scrapings from skin lesions.

=== Chickens ===
Microsporum gallinae causes a superficial infection that forms white lesions on the wattles and combs of chickens. Lesions may spread to the head and neck. The feathers are normally not affected by the dermatophyte, although some feather loss can occur. Roosters and chicks tend to be more susceptible to the infection, with fighting cocks having the highest rates of M. gallinae dermatophytosis. Although, it tends to resolve with treatment, the M. gallinae infection may become chronic. The lesions can also become infected with bacteria, complicating the infection. In some cases, it can resolve naturally without treatment; however, the infection may persist for weeks prior to clearance.

=== Humans ===
Microsporum gallinae has been isolated from the scalp, and smooth skin in human populations. Microsporum gallinae infections are most commonly tinea capitis and tinea corporis. Very few human cases of M. gallinae infection have been reported, none of which were life-threatening. Of the reported cases, individuals ranged from 3–96 years old. They had cutaneous lesions on the glabrous skin or the scalp. These localized lesions are frequently accompanied by itching. The cutaneous manifestations are very similar to those of Microsporum canis therefore many cases of Microsporum gallinae could have been unreported.

In rare cases, immunocompromised individuals form severe dissemination on the skin, instead of small localized lesions as a result of handling infected animals. Only one case of extensive dermatophytosis was reported involving M. gallinae infection of a person with AIDS.

== Treatment ==
The treatment of M. gallinae involves both topical and oral antifungals. Topical antifungals, such as: Terbinafine, Tolnaftate, and orally administered Griseofulvin have been used successfully to treat M. gallinae infections in humans and animals.
