= ATP deaminase =

Class of enzymes

Identifiers
- EC no.: 3.5.4.18
- CAS no.: 37289-21-7

Databases
- BRENDA: enzyme data
- ExPASy: NiceZyme view
- KEGG: enzyme entry
- MetaCyc: metabolic pathway
- Rhea: reactions
- PDB structures: RCSB PDB PDBe PDBsum
- Gene Ontology: AmiGO / QuickGO
Search
- PMC: articles
- PubMed: articles
- NCBI: proteins

ATP deaminase (EC 3.5.4.18) is an enzyme characterised from Microsporum audouini that catalyzes the hydrolysis of adenosine triphosphate (ATP) to inosine triphosphate and ammonia:

adenosine triphosphate
H_{2}O
NH_{3}
inosine triphosphate

The reaction has been associated with bacterial defense to bacteriophages.

This enzyme is a hydrolase, one acting on carbon-nitrogen bonds other than peptide bonds, specifically in cyclic amidines. The systematic name of this enzyme class is ATP aminohydrolase. This enzyme is also called adenosine triphosphate deaminase.

== Isozymes ==
This type of enzyme activity was reported in certain fungi (eg: microsporum, aspergillus) in a series of papers from 1967 to 1971, but currently no identified proteins of this type are listed in databases like uniprot/expasy.
