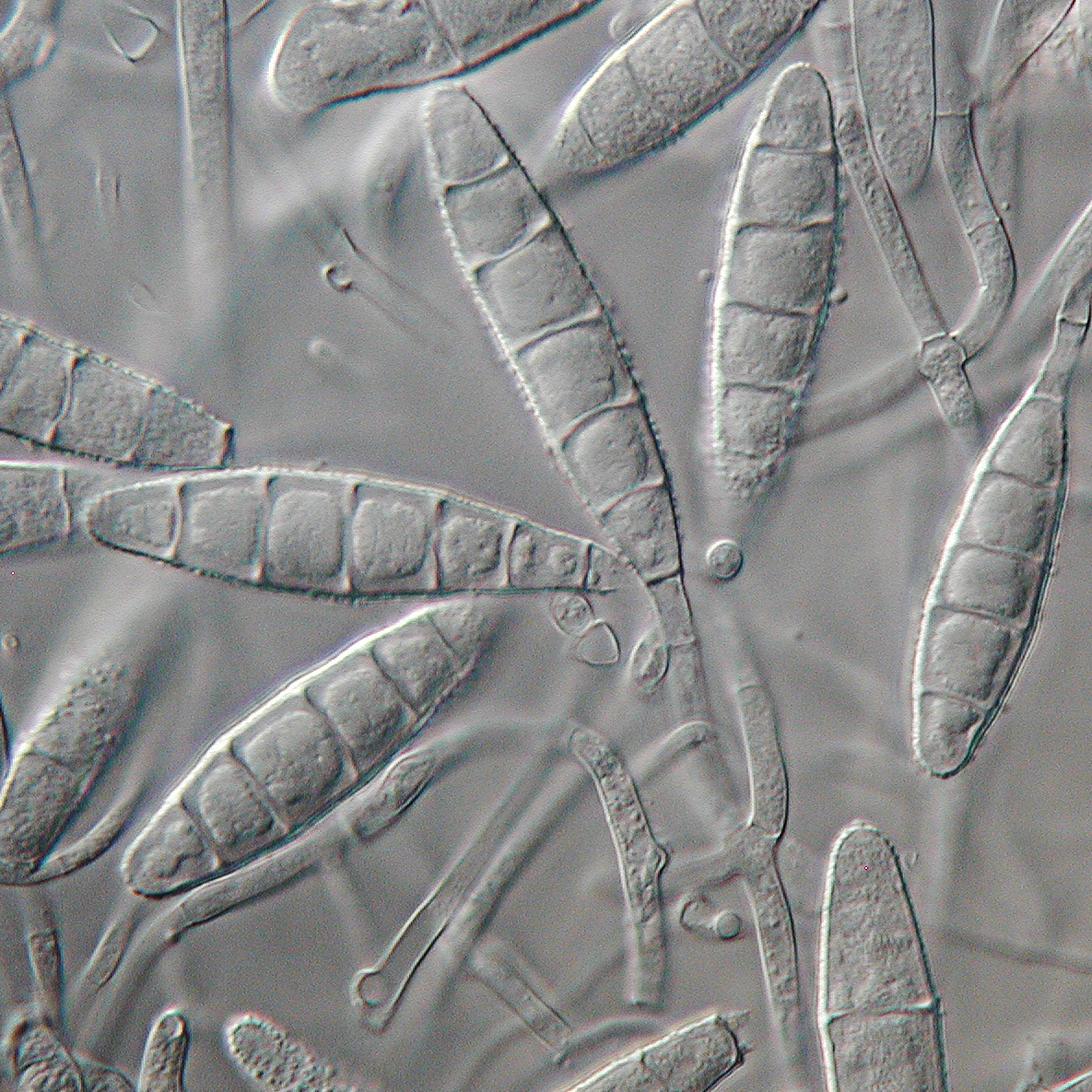

Scientific classification
- Kingdom: Fungi
- Division: Ascomycota
- Class: Eurotiomycetes
- Order: Onygenales
- Family: Arthrodermataceae
- Genus: Microsporum
- Species: M. gypseum

Binomial name
- Microsporum gypseum (E. Bodin) Guiart & Grigoraki (1928)

Synonyms
- Achorion gypseum (E. Bodin) E. Bodin (1907); Microsporum flavescens Horta (1912); Microsporum scorteum Priestley (1914); Microsporum xanthodes Fischer (1918)

= Microsporum gypseum =

Species of fungus

Microsporum gypseum is a soil-associated dermatophyte that occasionally is known to colonise and infect the upper dead layers of the skin of mammals. The name refers to an asexual "form-taxon" that has been associated with four related biological species of fungi: the pathogenic taxa Arthroderma incurvatum, A. gypsea, A. fulva and the non-pathogenic saprotroph A. corniculata. More recent studies have restricted M. gypseum to two teleomorphic species A. gypseum and A. incurvatum. The conidial states of A. fulva and A. corniculata have been assigned to M. fulvum and M. boullardii. Because the anamorphic states of these fungi are so similar, they can be identified reliably only by mating. Two mating strains have been discovered, "+" and "–". The classification of this species has been based on the characteristically rough-walled, blunt, club-shaped, multicelled macroconidia. Synonyms include Achorion gypseum, Microsporum flavescens, M. scorteum, and M. xanthodes. There has been past nomenclatural confusion in the usage of the generic names Microsporum and Microsporon.

== History ==
The teleomorphic states of this species were originally the first to be discovered by Arturo Nannizii for M. gypseum in 1927, but his contribution was largely ignored by the scientific community. Until Christine Dawson and J.C. Gentles discovered anamorph Arthroderma uncurvatum, the teleomorph of Trichophyton ajelloi. Shortly after this, D.M. Griffin rediscovered M. gypseum by Nanizzi, and another individual P.M. Stockdale also isolated the second teleomorph of the species naming it Nannizzia incurvatum. Stockdale then confirmed that Nannizzia incurvatum differed from the original isolate of M. gypseum isolated by Nannizzi and proposed that two teleomorphic states of M. gypseum exist for the anamorph, thereby naming the latter N. gypsea. Various authors, such as Stockdale, M.F. Visset, and J.W. Rippon have agreed that the differences in structure of the anamorphic state of the complex of M. gypseum are inadequate for making distinctions between anamorphic states because of how similar they look. It is now believed that very similar anamorphs, M. gypseum and M. fulvum, consist of three teleomorphs: N. gypsea, N. incurvatum, and N. fulva. Shortly after, Arthroderma replaced Nannizzia, where Arthroderma is depicting the teleomorphic states, and Microsporum refers to the anamorphic states.

== Morphology ==
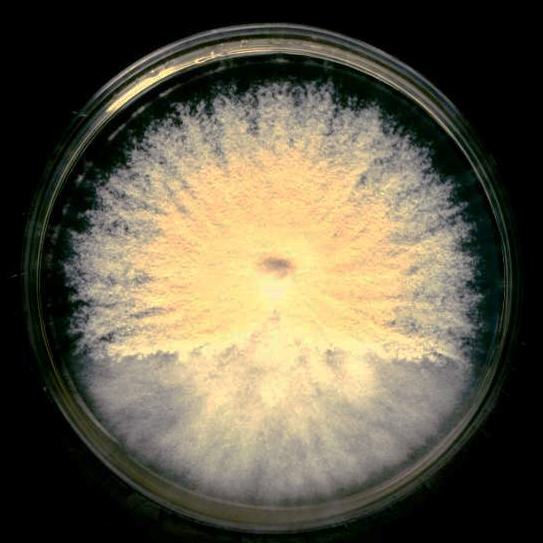
Colony of Microsporum gypseum on Sabouraud agar

The colonies of M. gypseum are described as cottony or powdery, they grow rapidly with a colour range of white to buff, with a reserve that can range from pink, to red, to yellow (cinnamon); they may occasionally have overtones of violet. The powdery appearance of the colony is due to the abundant production of macroconidia on the older mycelium, while the edges of the colony are described as scalloped to ragged and can exhibit pleomorphism. Macroconidia of M. gypseum have a substantial range that can occur as short pedicels, terminal, solitary, spindle shaped, large, thick walled, that are smooth or roughened, borne directly on hyphae or on short branches. They are often very large (e.g., 40–150 x 8–15 μm), ellipsoid to fusiform, moderately thick, have verrucose and are 4–6 septate. The macroconidia also possess a rat-like tail at the edges of the conidia. The ascoma of the fungus is a globose, appendaged gymnothecium that is pale buff in colour and 500–1250 μm in diameter. The peridial hyphae are hyaline, pale buff, septate, and are branched with thinly but have densely verrucose walls. Microconidia are drop shaped, clavate, (1.7–3.5 x 3.3–8.3 μm), unicellular, smooth-walled or can be slightly roughened and are created laterally on the hyphae. The abundance of microconidia is characteristic of the fungus. The hyphae or appendages are of three kinds in the fungi, the first being straight, slender, smooth walled hyphae that can grow up to 250 μm long; they taper at 2.5–4.0 μm in diameter at the base but close to about 1.5-2 μm. The second are slender, smooth-walled, septate, spiral hyphae that are rarely branched, which have a base diameter of 2.5–3.5 μm that taper up to 1.5-2 μm in diameter. They are usually variable in their coiled state, ranging from tightly to loosely coiled with numerous but variable numbers of turns. The third are thick-walled, verruculose, ellipsoid or fusiform macroconidia, that are 35–55 x 10–13.5 μm, with up to five septa. The asci of the fungus are subglobose, thin-walled, evanescent, which are 5-7 μm in diameter and contain a total of eight ascospores. The ascospores are smooth-walled, lenticular, 1.5–2 x 2.5–4 μm in diameter, and when in mass are yellow. Additionally, the spiral hyphal appendages that ornament the ascomata are often produced spontaneously in culture in the absence of gymnothecia. The fungus does not have any specific nutritional requirements for growth. The teleomorphic features of the microsporum on colonial and microscopic features are often done on Takashio's Medium. However, distinguishing is best done by mating (+/–) or by genetics. The species is heterothallic, and a such mating is controlled by a 1-locus, 2-allele compatibility system. Comparatively A. gypseum produces more spreading and a coarser granular colony; the macroconidia also are wider and the surface colour is brighter and redder than A. incurvatum. Colonies of A. incurvatum are pale buff in colour and finely granular, occasionally with a reddish to yellow reverse.

== Ecology ==
The species is geophilic, is abundant in soil and can be isolated around the world; it is in world wide distribution. However, it is rare in places such as the United States, United Kingdom, and Germany but common in South America. It is defined to be either cosmopolitan or confined to a certain graphical regions. The fungus can be found in soil of greenhouses and munition factories within these areas. The species itself commonly infects humans whom are closely tied to these areas because of agricultural work. In these areas, the M. gypseum complex prefers areas with higher soil moisture. Correlations between infections and soil types indicate that most improved soils of the clayey or clayey-sandy type are preferred, particularly those fertilized with keratinous manure. Additionally the fungus prefers soils with a pH of 7-7.5. Various soils in correlation with number of infections indicates that the fungus specifically prefers chernozemic soil (74%), of which positive isolates occur.

The role of infection by the fungi is influenced by the climate and geographical characteristics which favor the life of the dermatophyte as dictated by the average rainfall rate and average air temperatures. There tends to be a greater number of infections in later seasons as emphasis is placed on age, sex, months of onset of infection, and marked localization of the fungus. Adults, particularly males are typically infected, and of those infected usually involved in agricultural practices, such as greenhouses and plant nursery workers. School-age males are more prone than females because of contact in the soil. Onset of infection usually occurs from August to November, when humans come into contact with soil more often.

== Epidemiology ==
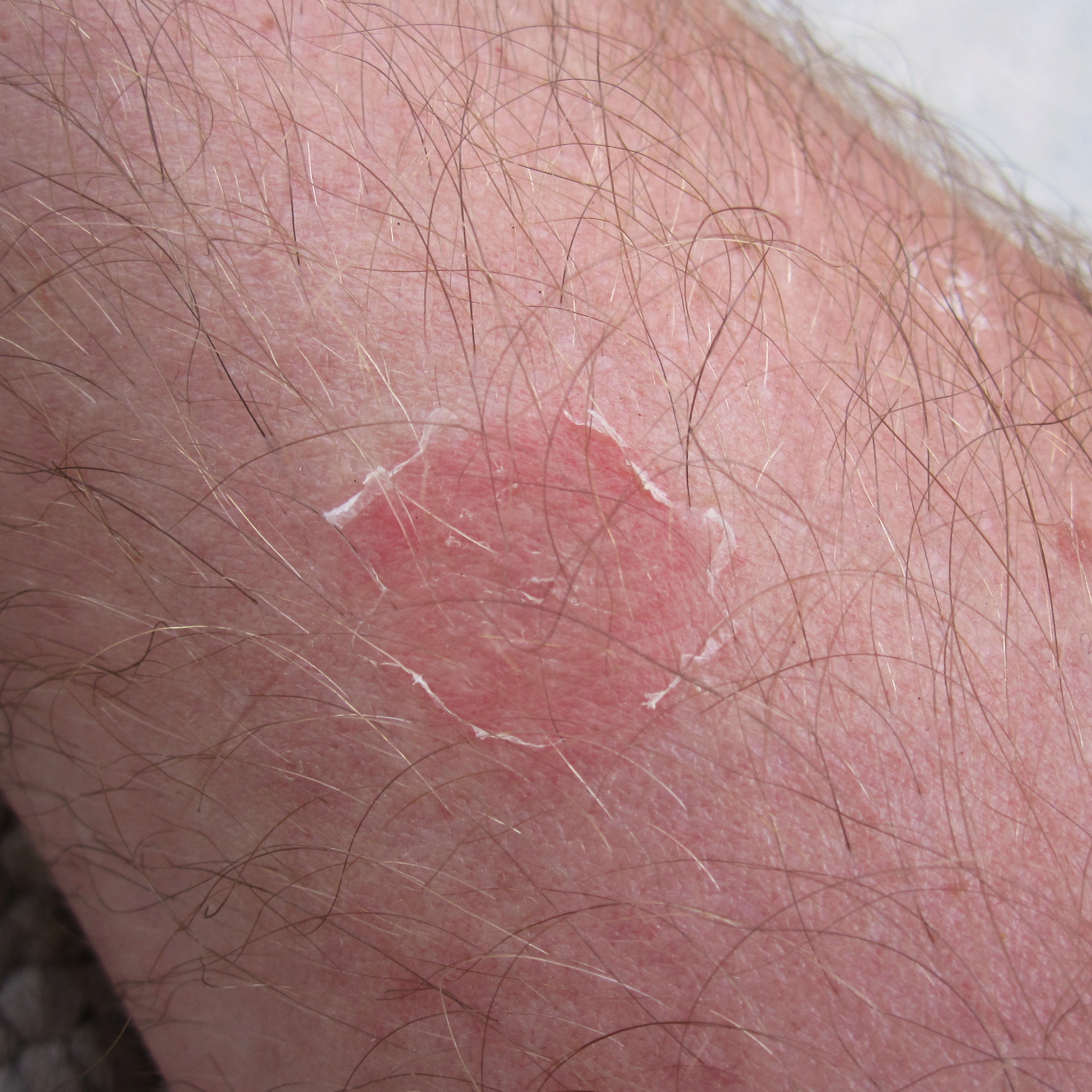
Ringworm lesion on forearm caused by Microsporum gypseum, incurred from fomite exposure through handling of firewood

The species is keratinophilic and is known for causing diseases on human skin. The genus Microsporum contains a number of pathogens to both humans and animals. The diseases it causes is classified as tinea or ringworm, with an adjective prescribing to the afflicted body part. Infection usually occurs as tinea capitis with suppuration and kerion formation. Pus formation can also occur from palpitated hair follicles. The species is ectothrix in terms of hair infection and can infect more than one part of the scalp at a time. The fungus produces hyphal growth at the scalp, and produces fronds (perforating organs) that invade the hair perpendicularly at the cortex near the edge of the cuticles. This can cause hair to be easily removed and dislodged from the scalp. Additionally, individuals with thick dark hair have a tendency to have a more severe inflammatory response. Tinea corporis, as well; this is characterized as an intense inflammatory response resembling a bacterial infection, thus surgical intervention is not needed because inflammation is due to the fungus alone. Also, tinea pedis, or athletes foot is common, while tinea unguium is rare. Additionally tinea manuum, of the thighs may occur as nodular granulomatous perifolliculitis, has been noted with infection of the thighs. Favus, (a severe form of tinea capitis) is rarely seen to be caused by this fungus. However the most common cause in humans seems to be tinea capitis and tinea corporis. As such clinical manifestations are localized to localization of contact. Transmission from animals to humans is supported; especially in those constrained to agricultural work. Handlers of laboratory animals, including guinea pigs, cats, and rabbits can also be at risk of contracting the fungi if the animals were predisposed to a certain area. The fungus infects animals that associate themselves with soil on a repeated basis. So as such animals like cattle are commonly affected but horses, rodents, monkeys and dogs have a tendency to acquire it. Entry of the fungus or contraction of one or more of these diseases is caused by deposition on human skin, and contact with soil is usually the primary cause of infection. Quantitatively, animal or humans must acquire at least ten fungal spores on a keratin rich surface in order to acquire an infection. Additionally of the mating types, the positive strain is more pathogenic then the negative strain. Identification is usually classified on the appearance of the fungus on the host via a sample culture. Both M. gypseum and M. fulvum have been commonly isolated from patients with human infections of the disease. Human to human transmission is known to occur.

Microsporum gypseum is categorized as a rare agent of infection, and usually only occurs in rural areas. The infections associated with hair can also be prone to fluorescence under a Wood's Lamp. Sometimes these clinical manifestations are not ringworm but appear as impetigo, scleroderma or psoriasis. The lesions are usually inflammatory, impetiginous, and sometimes bullous with rapid development and resolution; this is accompanied by scarring and permanent patches alopecia. The greatest intensity of inflammation is at the advancing margin of the ring. Direct examination with KOH of skin, reveal mycelium and masses of arthroconidia in some chains; KOH examination of hair produces distinctive large macroconidia in chain or irregular masses of hair. Mycelium was also discovered to run parallel to its length. Wood's lamp tests on humans indicate the fungus by fluorescence. The fungus is encountered rarely as a confirmed agent of onychomycosis in which the infection is validated by both a direct observation of filaments in the nail and recovery of the fungus in culture.

== Pathogenicity ==
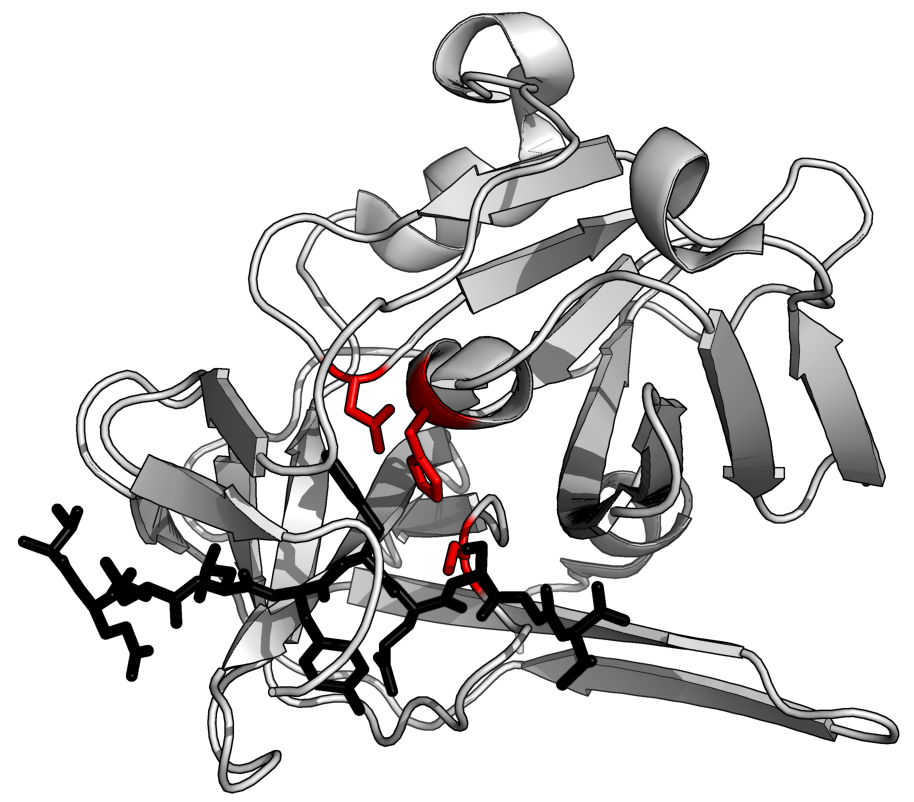
Example of a protease (TEV protease) complex

The pathophysiological mechanisms associated with the fungi are due to either the presence of substances on the surface of the fungi, or substances released by the fungi. These can include: surface adhesins, mannans, enzymes such as proteinases, peptidases, DNases, and lipases. The extracellular proteases released assist the fungus in invading the host skin barrier (keratin rich) with the presence of keratinase (keratinolytic activity increases). They then use the proteases to enhance their survival by chemically or physically altering the environment to their benefit by digesting the host proteins, thus providing themselves with nutrition. These proteases are found in all stages of growth (lag to declining) but peak at the mid log phase. These proteases are determined to be secreted during the lag phase of growth as they are secreted without the presence of host related proteins. It is assumed that the regulation and secretion of these enzymes is in part due to other differently regulated enzymes. Keratinolytic activity is also determined to be indicative of pathogenetic potential. Excessive exogenous carbohydrates such as glucose have been found to play a recessive role in protease release, as the presence of glucose decreases the amount of keratin hydrolyzed. The presence of hormones such as progesterone have also been seen to have an inhibitory effect on the growth of dermatophytes.

== Treatment ==
Therapy regarding deep fungal infections should be provided with amphotericin B therapy. Oral ketoconazole with topical enilconazole has been found to help treat skin lesions. Animal treatment is usually done with itraconazole or ketoconazole; most European countries use off label terbinafine in cats and dogs. However the most common antifungal drug used for systemic use is griseofulvin because it is often the cheapest; treatment is usually on a common dose regimen of 50 mg per kg every twelve to twenty four hours. Most of these administered drugs are variants of imidazoles. The treatment of onychomycosis involves the administration of itraconazole with systemic griseofulvin in combination with topical enilconazole, sometimes a ciclopiroxolamine solution and systemic terbinafine is used. The mistreatment of fungal pathogens is due to the thought of bacterial infection and the administration of corticosteroids. This causes a change in appearance of the lesion and can lead to a harder diagnosis. Mycological examination should form the basis of diagnosis before the administration of antibiotics or corticosteroids.
