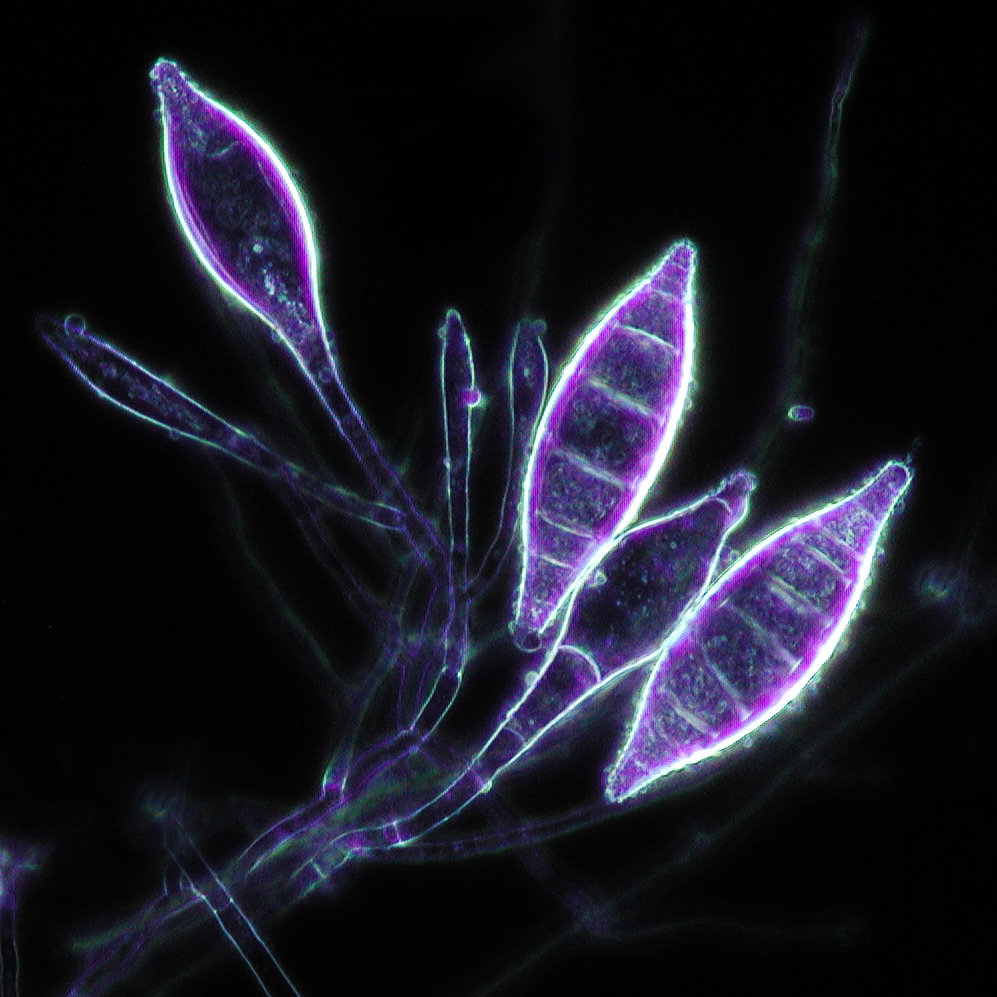
- Spindle-shaped, warted macroconidia of Microsporum canis

Scientific classification
- Kingdom: Fungi
- Division: Ascomycota
- Class: Eurotiomycetes
- Order: Onygenales
- Family: Arthrodermataceae
- Genus: Microsporum
- Species: M. canis

Binomial name
- Microsporum canis (E.Bodin) E.Bodin (1902)

Synonyms
- Microsporum audouinii var. canis E.Bodin (1900); Sabouraudites canis (E.Bodin) Langeron (1945)

= Microsporum canis =

Species of fungus

Microsporum canis is a pathogenic, asexual fungus in the phylum Ascomycota that infects the upper, dead layers of skin on domesticated cats, and occasionally dogs and humans. The species has a worldwide distribution.

== Taxonomy and evolution ==
Microsporum canis reproduces by means of two conidial forms, large, spindle-shaped, multicelled macroconidia and small, single-celled microconidia. First records of M. canis date to 1902. Evolutionary studies have established that M. canis, like the very closely related sibling species M. distortum and M. equinum, is a genetic clone derived from the sexually reproducing species, Arthroderma otae. Members of Ascomycota often possess conspicuous asexual and sexual forms that can coexist in time and space. Microsporum canis exemplifies a common situation in ascomycetous fungi in which, over time, one mating type strain has undergone habitat divergence from the other and established a self-sustaining reproductive population that consists only of the asexual form. It is hypothesized that asexual lineage of Microsporum canis evolved as a result of host-specific interactions, changes in ecological niche, as well as, geographic isolation of + and – mating types of Arthroderma otae, hence making it difficult to sustain sexual reproduction. Early domestication of animals, such as cats and dogs, in Africa led to a later evolution of host-specific fungus, Microsporum canis, which is commonly associated with loose fur animals. Nearly all reported isolates of Microsporum canis represent the "–" mating strain of A. otae. Together with two closely related taxa, M. ferrugineum and M. audouinii, the clade is thought to have an African center of origin.

== Morphology ==
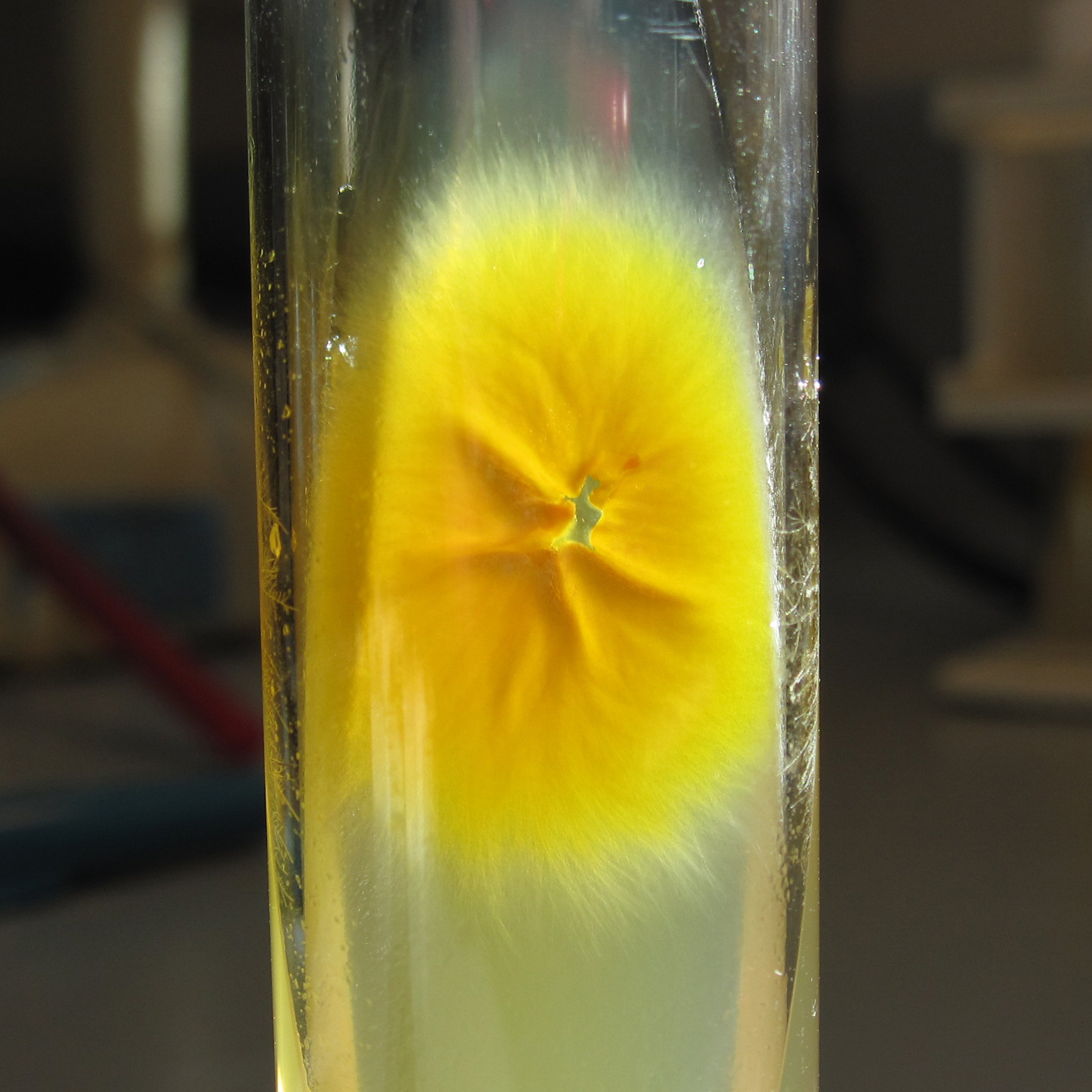
Characteristic yellow, feathery colony of Microsporum canis photographed on a slope of Modified Leonian's agar after seven days growth.

=== Colony morphology ===
Microsporum canis forms a white, coarsely fluffy spreading colony with a distinctive "hairy" or "feathery" texture. On the underside of the growth medium, a characteristic deep yellow pigment develops due to the metabolites secreted by the fungus. The intensity of this yellow pigmentation peak on the sixth day of colony growth and fades gradually making the identification of older colonies difficult. Some strains of M. canis fail to produce yellow pigment altogether, exhibit abnormally slow colony growth and form undeveloped macroconidia. Cultivation on polished rice tends to reestablish the typical growth morphology and is helpful for identification.

=== Microscopic morphology ===
Microsporum canis reproduces asexually by forming macroconidia that are asymmetrical, spindle-shaped and have cell walls that are thick and coarsely roughened. The interior portion of each macroconidium is typically divided into six or more compartments separated by broad cross-walls. Microsporum canis also produces microconidia that resemble those of many other dermatophytes and thus are not a useful diagnostic feature.

== Identification ==
Microsporum canis produces infections of scalp and body sites, creating highly inflammatory lesions associated with hair loss. Infection by this species can often be detected clinically using Wood's lamp, which causes infected tissues to fluoresce bright green Fluorescence is attributed to metabolite pteridine, which is produced by the fungus in actively growing hairs. Infected hairs remain fluorescent for prolonged periods of time (over the years), even after the death of the fungus. Despite the frequent use of Wood's lamp in the clinical evaluation of ringworm infections, diagnosis of M. canis requires the performance of additional tests given the potential for false positives. Culture of the fungus is most commonly used to evaluate morphological and physiological parameters of growth, and confirm the identity of the agent. Growth of the fungus on Sabouraud's agar (4% glucose), Mycosel or rice medium characteristically yields the bright yellow pigment. Microscopic examination of the growth can show the presence of the typical, warted and spindle-shaped macroconidia, confirming the identity of the isolate as M. canis. The In vitro hair perforation test, commonly used to differentiate many dermatophytes, is not particularly useful for this species as it reveals the formation of "pegs" that penetrate into hair shafts—a characteristic shared widely among many zoophilic species. Genetic analyses can be useful to establish the identity of atypical strains of M. canis; however the highly characteristic appearance of this species generally obviates the need for this more sophisticated method.

Most M. canis infections are caused by the "-" mating strain of its sexual progenitor, Arthroderma otae.

Microsporum canis has no specific growth factor or nutrition requirements, hence it grows well on most commercially available media. In addition, M. canis exhibits rapid colony growth at 25 °C. Two growth media that help distinguish M. canis from other Microsporum spp. (notably the morphologically similar species, M. audouinii) are polished rice and potato dextrose agar. On potato dextrose agar, M. canis produces a lemon-yellow pigment that is easily visualized, due to the presence of aerial hyphae, while on the polished rice, most isolates (even atypical strains) produce yellow pigment.

== Pathophysiology ==
It is considered a zoophilic dermatophyte, given that it typically colonizes the outer surface of animal's body. Hence, animals, cats and dogs are believed to be the population hosts of this fungus, while humans are occasional hosts, in which the fungus can induce secondary infections. Microsporum canis has been identified as a causal agent of a ringworm infection in pets, tinea capitis and tinea corporis in humans, children in particular.

Microsporum canis is among the most common dermatophytes associated with tinea capitis and tinea corporis. Unlike some dermatophyte species, M. canis typically does not cause large epidemics. Humans become infected as a result of direct or indirect contact with infected pets. Microsporum canis generally invades hair and skin; however, some nail infections have been reported. When hair shafts are infected, M. canis causes an ectothrix-type infection where the fungus envelopes the exterior of the hair shaft without the formation of internal spores. This colonization of the hair shaft causes it to become unsheathed, resulting in characteristic round or oval non-inflammatory lesions the develop on the scalp. Infection triggers an acute leukocytic reaction in subcutaneous tissues, which gradually becomes highly inflammatory and leads to hair loss, in the case of tinea capitis.

== Diagnosis ==
Typically, infections caused by M. canis are associated with alopecia in the case of tinea capitis, while ringworm infections in pets produce characteristic inflammatory lesions, which may or may not result in hair loss. This species has a propensity to cause subclinical infections in some animal species, particularly long-haired cats are frequent reservoirs of infection. Isolation of the fungus from brushed pet hair can aid in detection of either an actively growing fungus or a passive carriage of fungal hyphae or arthroconidia. In asymptomatic cases it is highly recommended to perform both Wood's lamp examination and microscopic analyses of suspected areas. In the case of transient carriers, lack of clinical manifestations is accompanied with low number of M. canis colonies, number of which declines upon re-testing.

== Treatment ==
Microsporum canis infections can be easily managed by topical antifungal agents; however severe cases may necessitate systemic therapy with griseofulvin, itraconazole or terbinafine. Treatment of human cases also requires the identification and elimination of the infectious reservoir, which typically involves the investigation and treatment of colonized animals and the elimination of infected bedding and other environmental reservoirs.

== Habitat ==
Despite its species name ("canis" implies dogs), the natural host of M. canis is the domestic cat. However this species can colonize dogs and horses as well. In all cases, it resides on the skin and fur. Microsporum canis may also persist as dormant spores in the environment for prolonged periods.

== Geographic distribution ==
Microsporum canis species have a worldwide distribution. Extremely high occurrence has been reported in Iran, while lower incidence is associated with England and Scandinavian countries, as well as South American countries. Microsporum canis is uncommon in some parts of US and Europe, and is completely absent from equatorial Africa.
