= Penicillium griseofulvum =

Scientific classification
- Kingdom: Fungi
- Division: Ascomycota
- Class: Eurotiomycetes
- Order: Eurotiales
- Family: Aspergillaceae
- Genus: Penicillium
- Species: P. griseofulvum

Binomial name
- Penicillium griseofulvum Dierckx, R.P. 1901

Type strain
- CBS 185.27

Synonyms
- Penicillium patulum; Penicillium urticae; Penicillium flexuosum; Penicillium maltum; Penicillium duninii

Species of fungus

Penicillium griseofulvum is a species of the genus of Penicillium which produces patulin, penifulvin A, cyclopiazonic acid, roquefortine C, shikimic acid, griseofulvin, and 6-Methylsalicylic acid (via a polyketide synthase). Penicillium griseofulvum occurs on cereals and nuts.
