= Ceroma =

Oil/wax, or cloth, in ancient wrestling

Ceroma (Greek: κήρωμα) was a word which first appeared in the works of the two Roman poets Juvenal and Martial and has come to be defined as a mixture of oil, wax and earth; or, a cloth with which ancient wrestlers rubbed themselves, not only to make their limbs more sleek and less capable of gripping, but more pliable and fit for exercise. However, scholars point out that this definition is a misunderstanding of satire and its correct meaning is a "layer of mud or clay forming the floor of the wrestling ring in the times of the Empire".

== See also ==
- Skin infections and wrestling
- Pankration
