= Skin infections and wrestling =

Role of skin infections in wrestling

Skin infections and wrestling is the role of skin infections in wrestling. This is an important topic in wrestling since breaks in the skin are easily invaded by bacteria or fungi and wrestling involves constant physical contact that can cause transmission of viral, bacterial, and fungal pathogens. These infections can also be spread through indirect contact, for example, from the skin flora of an infected individual to a wrestling mat, to another wrestler. According to the National Collegiate Athletic Association's (NCAA) Injury Surveillance System, ten percent of all time-loss injuries in wrestling are due to skin infections.

== Common forms of infection ==
Bacterial infections, or pathogens, make up the largest category of include Furuncles, Carbuncles, Folliculitis, Impetigo, Cellulitis or Erysipelas, and Staphylococcal disease. These range in severity, but most are quickly identified by irritated and blotchy patches of skin. Bacterial infections, of all skin infections, are typically the easiest to treat, using a prescribed anti-bacterial lotion or crème.

Molluscum Contagiosum is caused a DNA pox virus called the molluscum contagiosum virus. For adults, molluscum infections are often sexually transmitted, but in wrestling, it is spread either through direct contact or through contact with shared items such as gear or towels. Molluscum Contagiosum can be identified by pink bulbous growths that contain the virus. These typically grow to be 1–5 millimeters in diameter, and last from 6 to 12 months without treatment and without leaving scars. Some growths may remain for up to 4 years. Treatment for Molluscun Contagiosum must be designated by a healthcare professional because they can be dangerous. Usually for treatment liquid nitrogen can be used to freeze the molluscum off but other methods include other creams that burn the warts off, or oral medications.

The herpes simplex virus comes in two different strains, though only one is spread among wrestlers. Type 1 (HSV-1) can be transmitted through contact with an infected individual, and usually associated with sores on the lips, mouth, and face. HSV-1 can also cause infection of the eye, or even infection of the lining of the brain, known as meningoencephalitis. The lesions will heal on their own in 7 to 10 days, unless the infected individual has a condition that weakens the immune system. Once an infection occurs, the virus will spread to nerve cells, where it remains for the rest of the person's life. Occasionally, the virus will suddenly display recurring symptoms, or flares. There is no complete treatment for Herpes Simplex 1 but there is prescription medication to help ease and relieve the symptoms of the virus. Antiviral oral medication and topic medication can be prescribed to relieve the pain and soreness of the herpes virus.

Verrucae are small skin lesions which can be found on the bottom surface of the foot. They vary in length, from one centimeter in diameter upwards. Verrucae are caused by the human papilloma virus, which is common in all environments but does often attack the skin. The color of the lesion is usually paler then the normal tone of the skin, and is surrounded by a thick layer of calloused skin. Depending on the development of the Verrucae, the surface may show signs of blood vessels, which feed the infection.

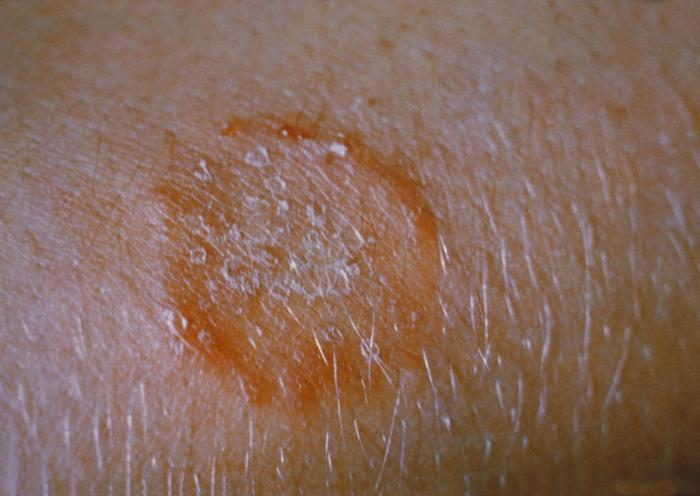
Advanced Tinea Corporis

Tinea infections, more commonly known as Ringworm, are the most common skin infections transmitted through wrestling. It is caused by parasitic fungi that survive on keratin, an organic material that is found in skin, hair, and nails. There are several varieties of Tinea, which are classified depending on their location. Tinea corporis is found on the body, tinea cruris (jock itch) on the groin, tinea capitis on the scalp, and tinea pedis (athlete's foot) on the foot. Although they are not harmful, they are highly contagious and difficult to treat. The symptoms of ringworm include patches of skin that are red, swollen, and irritated, forming the shape of a ring. Ringworm will last between two and four weeks with treatment. Tinea infections can be combatted orally or topically with numerous different medications. Some topical treatments include Mentax 1%, Lamisil 1%, Naftin 1% and Spectazole and these creams should be applied two times a day until the infection is gone. Oral treatments for Tinea include Lamisil, Sporanox, and Diflucan.

== Rules ==
At the start of each wrestling meet, trained referees examine the skin of all wrestlers before any participation. During this examination, male wrestlers are to wear shorts; female wrestlers are only permitted to wear shorts and a sports bra. Open wounds and infectious skin conditions that cannot be adequately protected are considered grounds for disqualification from both practice and competition. This essentially means that the skin condition has been deemed as non-infectious and adequately medicated, covered with a tight wrapping and proper ointment. In addition, the wrestler must have developed no new lesions in the 72 hours before the examination. Wrestlers who are undergoing treatment for a communicable skin disease at the time of the meet or tournament shall provide written documentation to that effect from a physician. This documentation should include the wrestler's diagnosis, culture results (if possible), date and time therapy began, and the exact names of medication for treatment. These measures aren't always successful, and the infection is sometimes spread regardless.

== Prevention ==
According to the NCAA Wrestling Rules and Interpretations and NFHS Sports Medicine Advisory Committee, used by all high schools in the United States:

Infection control measures, or measures that seek to prevent the spread of disease, should be utilized to reduce the risks of disease transmission. Efforts should be made to improve wrestler hygiene practices, to utilize recommended procedures for cleaning and disinfection of surfaces, and to handle blood and other bodily fluids appropriately. Suggested measures include: promotion of hand hygiene practices; educating athletes not to pick, squeeze, or scratch skin lesions; encouraging athletes to shower after activity; educating athletes not to share protective gear, towels, razors or water bottles; ensuring recommended procedures for cleaning and disinfection of wrestling mats, all athletic equipment, locker rooms, and whirlpool tubs are closely followed; and verifying clean up of blood and other potentially infectious materials.

More ways of prevention include wearing long sleeve shirts and sweatpants to limit the amount of skin to skin contact. A wrestler should also not share their equipment with other teammates. Body wipes are also common to see coaches must also enforce the disinfecting and sanitary cleansing of the wrestling mats and other practice areas. This can greatly limit the spread of skin infections that can infect an individual indirectly.

One high school wrestling coach from Southern California described his methods of prevention using three procedures:

Keep the mats [clean] ... you've got to bleach and mop them every day before practice. Along the same lines, gear should also be washed regularly, especially headgear…Most importantly, the wrestlers need to shower immediately after practices. If one kid doesn’t, and he gets [infected], it can spread to everyone else on the team within a week. I’ve had it happen before, to the point where some schools won’t allow any of our guys to wrestle in a meet. When this happens, it’s a huge blow to the school’s record and reputation. In the future, we are less likely to be invited to exclusive tournaments in the coming year.

== Treatment ==
For every form of contagious infection, there is a readily available form of medication that can be purchased at any pharmacy. It is a commonly held belief among wrestlers, however, that these ointments do not treat symptoms Sometimes wrestlers who don't want to report an infection to their coach will resort to unusual and unhealthy treatments. Included among these ‘home remedies’ are nail polish remover, bleach, salt, and vinegar solutions, which are used to either suffocate or burn the infection, often leaving extensive scars. The remedies, while sometimes successful, are not guaranteed to actually kill the infection, often only eliminating visible symptoms temporarily. Even though the infection may no longer be symptomatic, it can still be easily transmitted to other individuals. Because of this, it is recommended that wrestlers attempting to treat skin infections use conventional medicine, as prescribed by a physician.

== Significant outbreaks ==
HSV-1 (July 1989) – An outbreak of Herpes Simplex was reported at a four-week high school wrestling camp in Minneapolis, which was attended by wrestlers from 26 states and 1 Canadian province. According to a report on the outbreak: “Wrestlers wore jerseys during practice sessions, but the use of headgear was optional. Wrestling mats were mopped twice each day with disinfectant. Epidemiologic and clinical data were collected during the final two days of the camp after officials alerted the Minnesota Department of Health, which, in turn, alerted the Centers for Disease Control. Results from 171 wrestlers (of 175 attendees) showed that 35 percent (60 boys) met the case definition for HSV-1 infection.”

== See also ==
- List of cutaneous conditions
- Ceroma, cloth with which ancient wrestlers rubbed themselves
- Dermatitis
- Skin flora
