= Endothrix =

Endothrix refers to dermatophyte infections of the hair that invade the hair shaft and internalize into the hair cell. This is in contrast to exothrix (ectothrix), where a dermatophyte infection remains confined to the hair surface. Using an ultraviolet Wood's lamp, endothrix infections will not fluoresce whereas some exothrix infections may fluoresce bright green or yellow-green.

== Symptoms ==
While many cases of endothrix do not display the characteristics of severe inflammation seen with so many ectothrix infections, pustules and erythema can occur. However, lesions may mimic other skin conditions such as seborrheic dermatitis. On careful inspection it might be possible to find small broken hair stubs within hair follicles, but hair loss may be confined to individual hairs and it is important to search the scalp hair of suspected cases carefully to detect infections.
