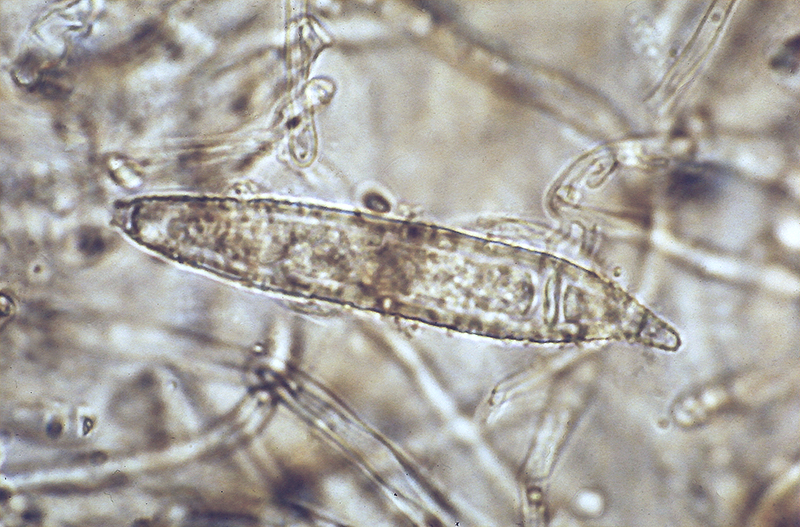

Scientific classification
- Kingdom: Fungi
- Division: Ascomycota
- Class: Eurotiomycetes
- Order: Onygenales
- Family: Arthrodermataceae
- Genus: Microsporum
- Species: M. audouinii

Binomial name
- Microsporum audouinii Gruby (1843)

= Microsporum audouinii =

Species of fungus

Microsporum audouinii is an anthropophilic fungus in the genus Microsporum. It is a type of dermatophyte that colonizes keratinized tissues (primarily hair) causing infection. The fungus is characterized by its spindle-shaped macroconidia (7–30 × 35–160 μm), clavate microconidia (2.5–3.5 × 4–7 μm) as well as its pitted or spiny external walls.

== Growth conditions ==
This fungus is often found in soil that is rich in keratinous material. However, there are other factors that can influence its growth, such as pH, relative humidity, organic carbon, nitrogen and temperature. Microsporum audouinii appears to prefer a neutral pH in the range of 6.8-7.0 and room temperature for growth. Drastic increases or decreases in temperature can inhibit its growth. Microsporum audouinii is effective in utilizing its carbon sources, but growth is strongest in the hexoses (glucose, mannose and fructose) and weakest in maltose, sucrose, lactose and galactose. It is unable to synthesize the vitamins thiamine, niacin and riboflavin and requires an exogenous supply of these materials to support its growth. The fungus is only able to utilize organic nitrogen sources, particularly nitrogen from arginine and urea.

== Epidemiology ==
Microsporum audouinii causes the infections Tinea capitis (scalp ringworm) and Tinea corporis. These superficial dermal diseases are generally found in prepubescent children (starting at 6 months) and rarely affect adults. There are a few reasons why children are more susceptible to M. audouinii. Differences in the chemical composition and quantity of the triglycerides in hair sebum secreted are the primary reasons. In instances whereby the triglyceride content in the sebum decreases so does the susceptibility of a person to the fungus. Cases like those are seen in postmenopausal women of whom suffer hormonal changes which can contribute to triglyceride reduction. In addition, increased sweat production as well as the presence of Malassezia furfur decreases the ability for M. audouinii to thrive. Malassezia furfur is an opportunistic lipophilic yeast that is a part of the human cutaneous flora in adults. In most cases of adult onset Tinea capitis due to M. audouinii, there is at least one predisposing factor such as immunocompromise (e.g., diabetes mellitus, systemic lupus, organ transplant and HIV), a local animal reservoir (e.g., infected pet or farm animal) and hormonal changes in postmenopausal women.

Tinea capitis is seen in tropical, rural and suburban regions. In the 19th and early 20th centuries, M. audouinii was the primary fungus responsible for Tinea capitis throughout the US and Western Europe. With the advent of antimycotic agents, its prevalence has decreased. But in the poorer parts of Africa, especially Central and West Africa, M. audouinii remains the primary dermatophyte responsible for this disease.

== Pathology ==
Tinea capitis develops when an inoculum from another individual or animal comes into a 'compromised scalp', which can occur when the stratum corneum of the scalp is exposed. This can be due to trauma of the scalp, tight hair braiding or hair styling with infected tools. In general, fungal spread is facilitated by poverty, poor hygiene and overcrowding.

Once the fungus has entered the stratum corneum it continues to invade the epidermis; it then enters a hair follicle, penetrates the hair shaft and grows down the length of the hair. The hyphae grow distally until they reach the upper limits of the zone of keratinization where the nucleated hair shaft cornifies completely and is converted into hard, anucleated keratin. The terminal end of the growing hyphae forms a ring (Adamson's Fringe). As the hair continues to grow outwards, hyphae are brought to the surface (scalp) and arthroconidia are produced. Eventually due to mechanical forces (the movement of the fungi) and keratinase (a chymotrypsin-like enzyme with optimal activity at an acidic pH), all but 1–2 mm of the diseased hair follicle weakens and falls off. The remaining hair has a characteristic dark grey appearance due to the Adamson's Fringe.

== Diagnostic tests ==
There is an array of different tests to differentiate between fungi. Direct microscopy with 10% KOH would show small to medium conidia with ectothrix hair invasion. Performing a wet mount would show 'racquet shaped hyphae' with few macro and microconidia. Histological examination of a diseased hair shows clefts that between the inner root sheath and hair.

Microsporum audouinii fluoresces when examined in ultraviolet light (Wood's lamp). The two main growth media employed to test for M. audouinii are Sabouraud's Dextrose agar and potato dextrose agar. On the former, growth is slow with and poor sporulation with most strains producing a few abortive macroconidia and sparse microconidia. The colonies are flat, dense and cottony in texture with a greyish-white to reddish brown hue. On Potato Dextrose agar, colonies are white with a silky texture and a peach-coloured underside.

Microsporum audouinii can be differentiated from non-sporulating strains of the similar M. canis by culture on autoclaved rice. Under these conditions, M. canis typically yields abundant growth and little to no pigmentation whereas M. audouinii produces no visible growth and abundant brown pigment on the rice grains. Fungal DNA barcoding is a fairly new diagnostic tool for the rapid identification of these fungi.

== Treatment ==
A symptomatic patient will present an unusual amount of itching and alopecia. Primary treatment involves griseofulvin and terbinafine. However, these agents have drug-drug interactions and over a prolonged period of time can cause liver damage. Currently, squalamine, an aminosterol with fungicidal properties is being researched as its mechanism of action is different from that of the aforementioned medicines, making it a good drug for those who don't respond well to griseofulvin, itraconazole, fluconazole, or terbinafine. Systemic treatment with oral medication and anti-fungal shampoos has also been effective. Antifungal shampoos (ketoconazole 2% shampoo or selenium sulfide 2.5% ) are effective as they reduce the transmission of the diseased hair by preventing its shedding. Other treatments include, epilation of the infected follicles, topical ointments and steroidal treatments. Topical ointments immobilize the fungus and reduce shedding but they do not penetrate the hair follicle and hence must be used in conjunction with other treatment methods. Steroidal treatments aid in inflammation and pain reduction.
