= Enilconazole =

- Chemical structure of enilconazole

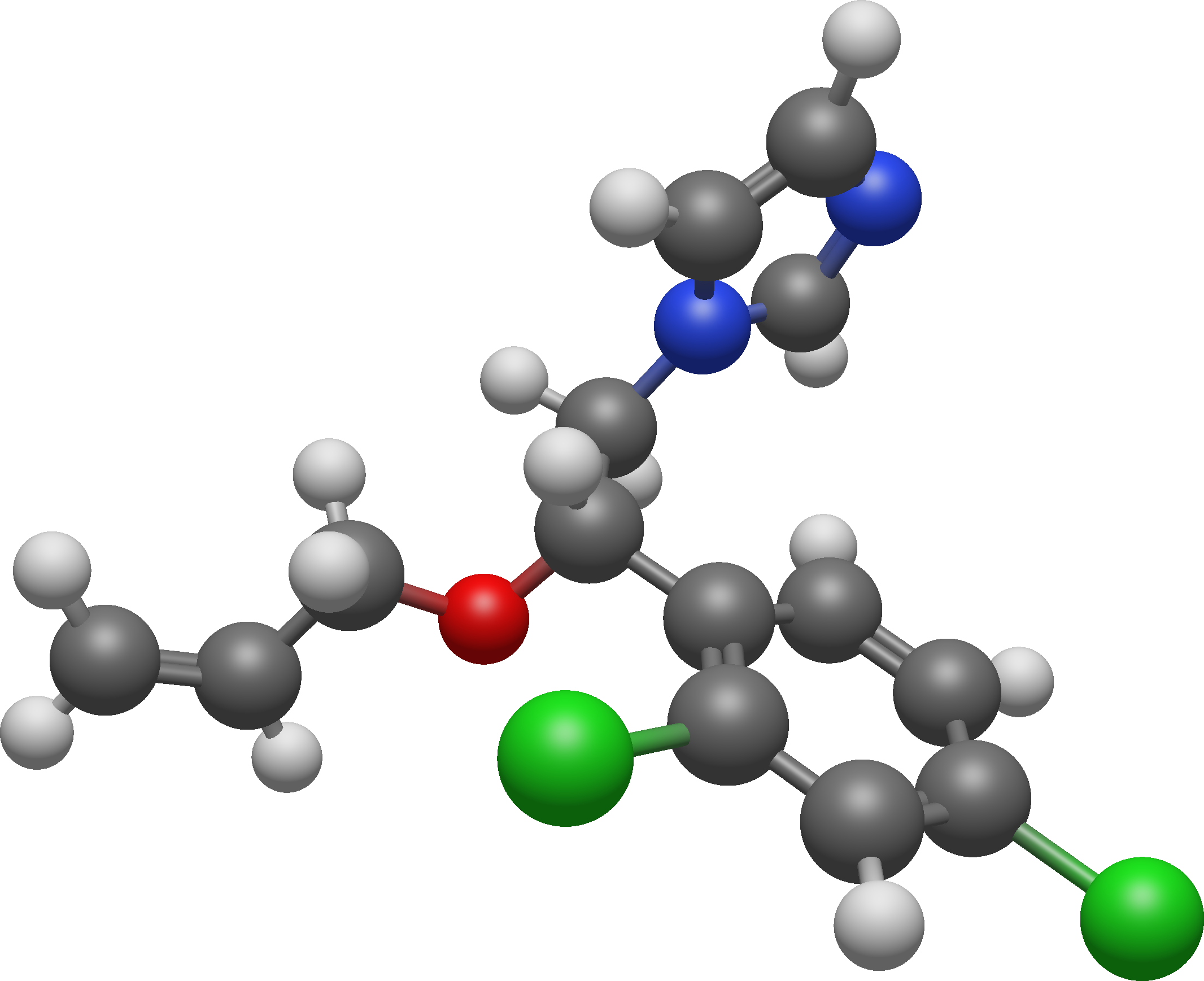
- Chemical structure of enilconazole 3D

Names
- Preferred IUPAC name 1-{2-(2,4-Dichlorophenyl)-2-[(prop-2-en-1-yl)oxy]ethyl}-1H-imidazole
- Other names 1-[2-(Allyloxy)-2-(2,4-dichlorophenyl)ethyl]-1H-imidazole; Imazalil; Chloramizole

Identifiers
CAS Number	35554-44-0
3D model (JSmol)	Interactive image
ChEBI	CHEBI:81927
ChEMBL	ChEMBL356918
ChemSpider	34116
ECHA InfoCard	100.047.817
KEGG	D03997
PubChem CID	37175
UNII	6K0NOF3XQ6
CompTox Dashboard (EPA)	DTXSID8024151
- InChI: InChI=1S/C14H14Cl2N2O/c1-2-7-19-14(9-18-6-5-17-10-18)12-4-3-11(15)8-13(12)16/h2-6,8,10,14H,1,7,9H2 Key: PZBPKYOVPCNPJY-UHFFFAOYSA-N; InChI=1/C14H14Cl2N2O/c1-2-7-19-14(9-18-6-5-17-10-18)12-4-3-11(15)8-13(12)16/h2-6,8,10,14H,1,7,9H2 Key: PZBPKYOVPCNPJY-UHFFFAOYAI
- SMILES: Clc1ccc(c(Cl)c1)C(OCC=C)Cn2ccnc2

Properties
Chemical formula	C_{14}H_{14}Cl_{2}N_{2}O
Molar mass	297.18 g·mol^{−1}
Appearance	Slightly yellow to brown solidified oil
Density	1.23 g/mL
Melting point	50 °C (122 °F; 323 K)
Boiling point	347 °C (657 °F; 620 K)
Solubility in water	1400 mg/L (20 °C)

Pharmacology
ATCvet code	QD01AC90 (WHO)

Hazards
Flash point	181 °C (358 °F; 454 K)
- Lethal dose or concentration (LD, LC)
LD_{50} (median dose)	227 mg/kg (oral rat); 4200 mg/kg (dermal, rabbit); 16 mg/l/4 h (inhalation, rat)
- Except where otherwise noted, data are given for materials in their standard state (at 25 °C [77 °F], 100 kPa). verify (what is ?) Infobox references

Enilconazole (synonyms imazalil, chloramizole) is a fungicide widely used in agriculture, particularly in the growing of citrus fruits. Trade names include Freshgard, Fungaflor, and Nuzone.

Enilconazole is also used in veterinary medicine as a topical antimycotic.

== History ==
In 1983, enilconazole was first introduced by Janssen Pharmaceutica and it has since consistently been registered as an antifungal postharvest agent. Shortly after its introduction, enilconazole was used for seed treatment in 1984 and later used in chicken hatcheries in 1990. Like any fungicide, it was used to protect crops from becoming diseased and unable to yield a profitable harvest. Today, it continues to be utilized as an agricultural aid for its contribution to maintaining crop integrity and production output.

== Use on crops ==
Enilconazole is found on a wide variety of fruits and vegetables, but it is primarily used on tubers for storage. Common fungi that are attracted to tubers are Fusarium spp, Phoma spp, and Helminthosporium solani which depreciate the crop quality. In 1984, when enilconazole was initially used for seed treatment, barley was a main target to mitigate crop loss due to disease.

In addition, the antifungal agent is commonly used on citrus fruits.

In the EU its use as a fungicide is permitted within some limits and imported fruits may contain limited amounts.

== Hazards ==
Enilconazole (also known as imazalil) has low acute toxicity but has raised concerns regarding potential carcinogenicity based on older studies.

In 1999, based on studies in rodents, enilconazole was identified as "likely to be carcinogenic in humans" under The United States Environmental Protection Agency's Draft Guidelines for Carcinogenic Assessment. However, because pesticide residues are well below the concentrations associated with risk, the lifetime cancer risk estimate associated with citrus fruit contamination was valued as insignificant.

The EPA has established an equivalent toxicity level for human exposure at 6.1 × 10^{−2} mg/kg/day. This level placed it in Category II, II, and IV for oral, dermal, and inhalation toxicity respectively. Category I is classified as highly irritating to the eyes, but not to the skin. As for oral toxicity, when the fungicide is transferred via food into the body, it must be metabolized before it can do any damage.

Under California's Proposition 65, enilconazole is listed as "known to the State to cause cancer".

The EPA determined there is no substantial risk of enilconazole toxicity through food and water exposure. Enilconazole has a very minute degree of mobility, so its level of drinking water contamination is quite low. The estimated environmental concentration (EEC) found the levels to be 0.072 ppb for surface water, which is much less than the 500 ppb comparison level for drinking water.

In the European Union, the European Food Safety Authority (EFSA) has evaluated imazalil multiple times (e.g., peer reviews under Regulation (EC) No 1107/2009 and MRL reviews up to 2025). It has not classified imazalil as carcinogenic or genotoxic in humans at relevant exposure levels, though concerns were noted for certain metabolites (e.g., R014821 genotoxicity initially not fully ruled out but addressed in later data as unlikely). The EU classifies it under CLP as suspected of causing cancer (Carc. 2, H351) in some contexts, but dietary exposure is not considered to exceed health-based guidance values (ADI 0.025 mg/kg bw/day; ARfD 0.05 mg/kg bw/day). Imazalil is approved in the EU with restrictions.
