= Exothrix =

Type of infection of the hair

Exothrix refers to Dermatophyte infections of the hair that infect the hair surface. This is in contrast to Endothrix, where a Dermatophyte mainly invades the hair shaft. Using an ultraviolet Wood's lamp, endothrix infections will not fluoresce whereas exothrix infections will.
