= Tinea faciei =

- Other names: Ringworm of the face
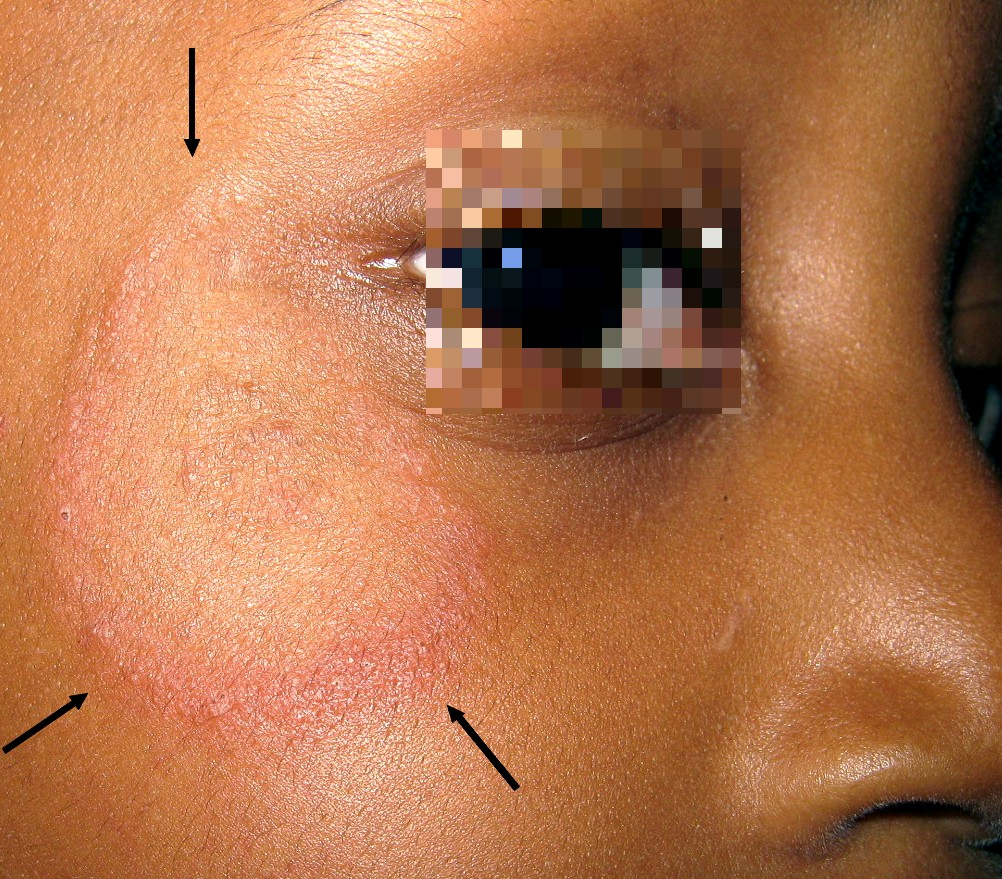
- Tinea faciei
- Specialty: Dermatology
- Symptoms: Facial ringworm appears as one or more pink-to-red scaly patches which contain bumps, blisters, or scabs.They can be itchy, and it may get worse or feel sunburned after exposure to the sun.
- Treatment: topical creams and lotions: Terbinafine, Clotrimazole, Miconazole, Econazole, Oxiconazole, Ketoconazole, Sulconazole, Naftifine

Tinea faciei is a fungal infection of the skin of the face. It generally appears as a photosensitive painless red rash with small bumps and a raised edge appearing to grow outwards, usually over eyebrows or one side of the face. It may feel wet or have some crusting, and overlying hairs may fall out easily. There may be a mild itch.

== Treatment ==
Most infections can be treated with topical antifungal medication. Rarely, more extensive or long-standing infections may require treatment with oral antifungals. The infection will still be contagious between 24 and 48 hours of the first treatment.

The ringworm should go away within 4–6 weeks after using effective treatment.

== See also ==
- Tinea corporis
- Antifungal drug
- List of cutaneous conditions
