= Geophilic =

Ecological term for soil loving organisms

== Overview ==
Geophilic means soil loving or preferring the soil habitats. This term is commonly used when referring to certain types of fungi or molds that live in the soil (mycology). Many of these organisms are usually recovered from the soil but occasionally infect humans and animals. They cause a marked inflammatory reaction, which limits the spread of the infection and may lead to a spontaneous cure but may also leave scars.

Can also refer to someone who loves the earth, sustainability, or “green” initiatives. An individual with these tendencies may be referred to as a "geophile."

== In Mycology ==
Dermatophytes, which are fungi that infect keratinized tissue, such as fur, feathers, hooves, and other keratin sources, can be geophilic species. They are typically found in soil, decomposing keratinized tissue. They are one of three ecological categories defined by habitat preference, alongside anthropophilic (human loving) and zoophilic (animal loving). Geophilic fungi are generally saprotrophic, decomposing organic matter in soil, and play important roles in nutrient cycling and soil ecology.

Classification is usually to determine sources of infection. Geophilic and zoophilic dermatophytes typically cause more severe, inflamed, self-limiting lesions, whereas anthropophilic dermatophytes generally cause chronic lesions with less inflammation.

== Examples ==
- Nannizzia Fulva
- Nannizzia Gypsea
- Arthroderma Quadrifidum
- Arthroderma quadrifidum
- Arthroderma tuberculatum
