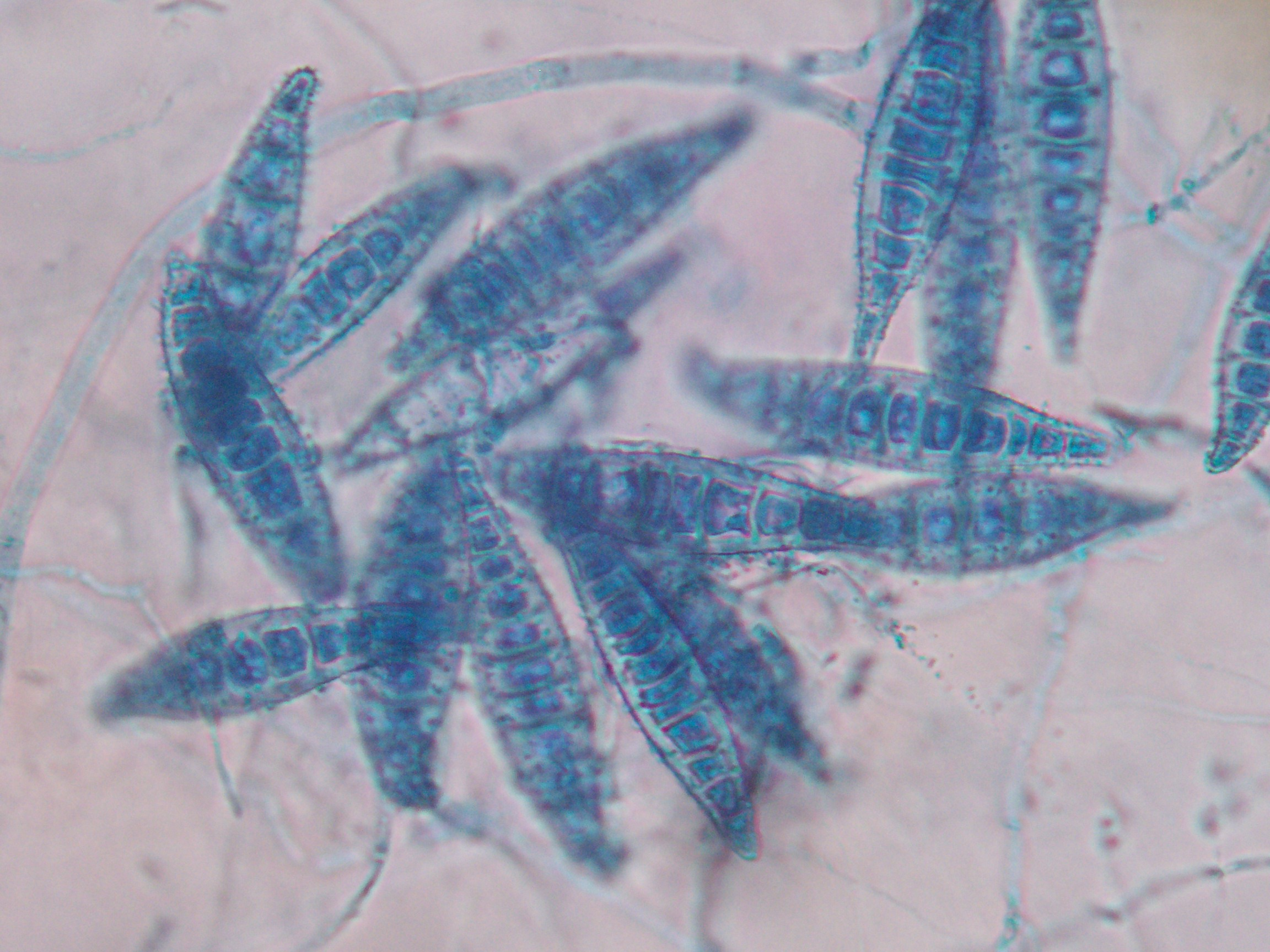
- Microsporum canis

Scientific classification
- Kingdom: Fungi
- Division: Ascomycota
- Class: Eurotiomycetes
- Order: Onygenales
- Family: Arthrodermataceae
- Genus: Microsporum; Gruby (1843)

Type species
- Microsporum audouinii Gruby (1843)

Synonyms
- Closteroaleurosporia Grigoraki (1924); Closterosporia Grigoraki (1924); Nannizzia Stockdale (1961); Sabouraudites M.Ota & Langeron (1923); Thallomicrosporon Benedek (1964)

= Microsporum =

Genus of fungi

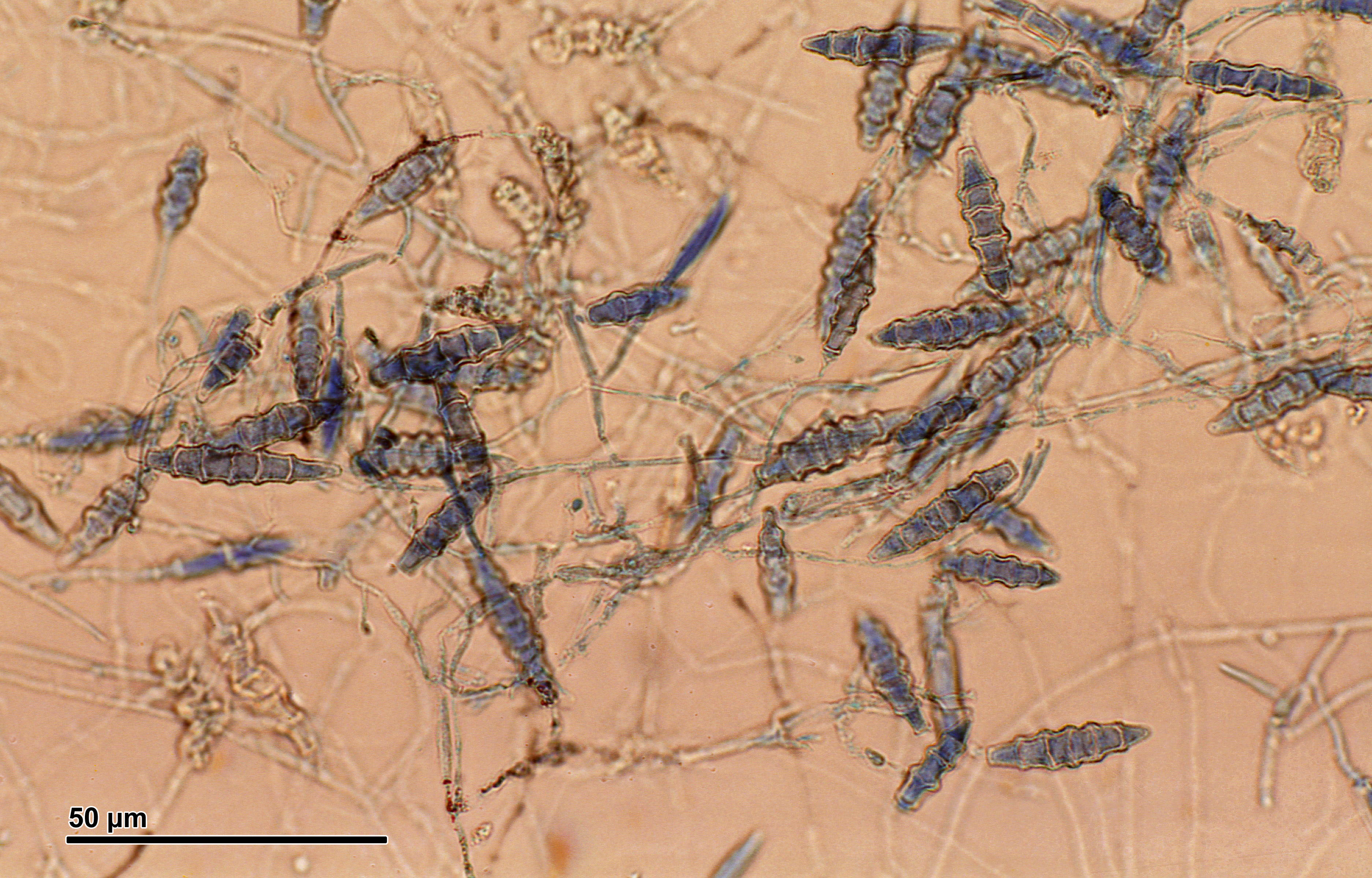
Microsporum gypseum

Microsporum is a genus of fungi that causes tinea capitis, tinea corporis, ringworm, and other dermatophytoses (fungal infections of the skin). Microsporum forms both macroconidia (large asexual reproductive structures) and microconidia (smaller asexual reproductive structures) on short conidiophores. Macroconidia are hyaline, multiseptate, variable in form, fusiform, spindle-shaped to obovate, 7–20 by 30–160 μm in size, with thin or thick echinulate to verrucose cell walls. Their shape, size and cell wall features are important characteristics for species identification. Microconidia are hyaline, single-celled, pyriform to clavate, smooth-walled, 2.5–3.5 by 4–7 um in size and are not diagnostic for any one species.

The separation of this genus from Trichophyton is essentially based on the roughness of the macroconidial cell wall, although in practice this may sometimes be difficult to observe. Seventeen species of Microsporum have been described; however, only the more common species are included in these descriptions.

The keratinolytic properties that Microsporum cookei possesses suggests that the fungus can alternatively be used for recycling the large amount of industrial keratinic waste.

== Species ==
- Microsporum amazonicum
- Microsporum audouinii
- Microsporum boullardii
- Microsporum canis
- Microsporum canis var. distortum
- Microsporum cookei
- Microsporum distortum
- Microsporum duboisii
- Microsporum equinum
- Microsporum ferrugineum
- Microsporum fulvum
- Microsporum gallinae
- Microsporum gypseum
- Microsporum langeronii
- Microsporum nanum
- Microsporum persicolor
- Microsporum praecox
- Microsporum ripariae
- Microsporum rivalieri
