= Barber's itch =

Barber's itch may refer to:

- Pseudofolliculitis barbae
- Sycosis vulgaris
- Tinea barbae
