= Sycosis =

Inflammation of hair follicles

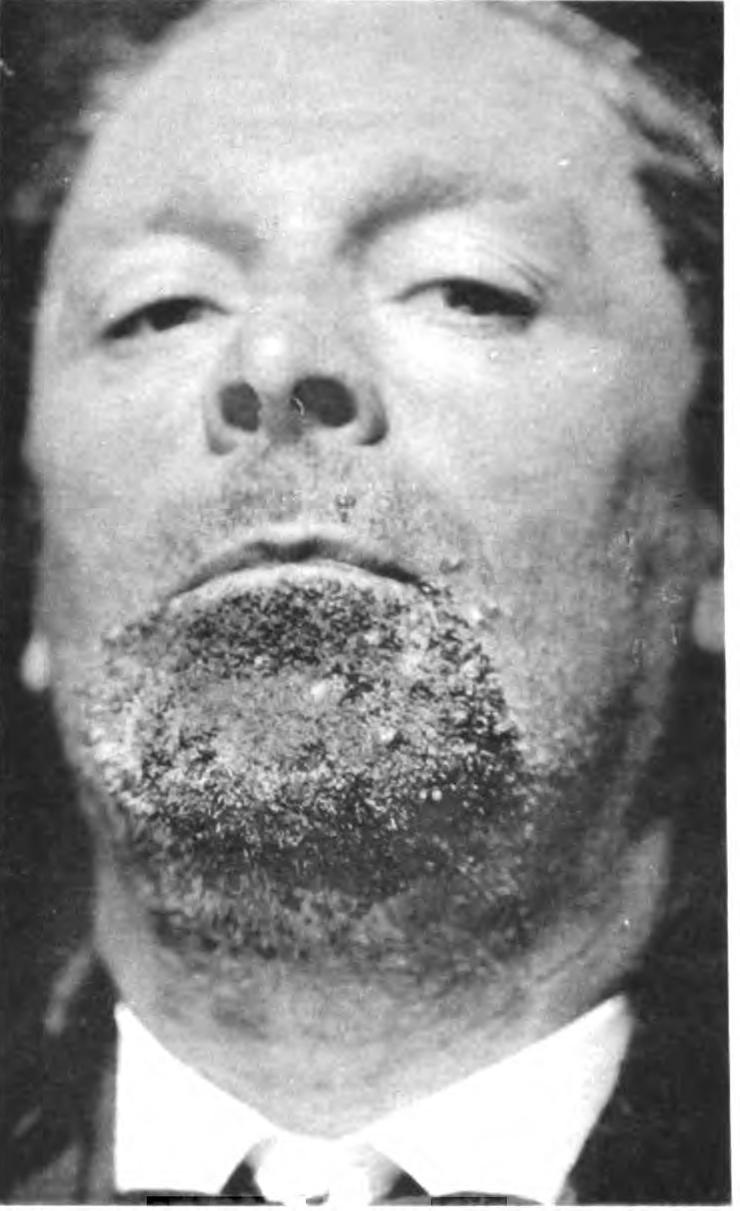
- Sycosis
- Specialty: Dermatology

Sycosis is an inflammation of hair follicles, especially of the beard area, and generally classified as papulopustular and chronic.

== Types ==
Types include:

- Sycosis barbae
- Lupoid sycosis
- Tinea sycosis
- Herpetic sycosis
