= Book of Leviticus =

Third book of the Bible

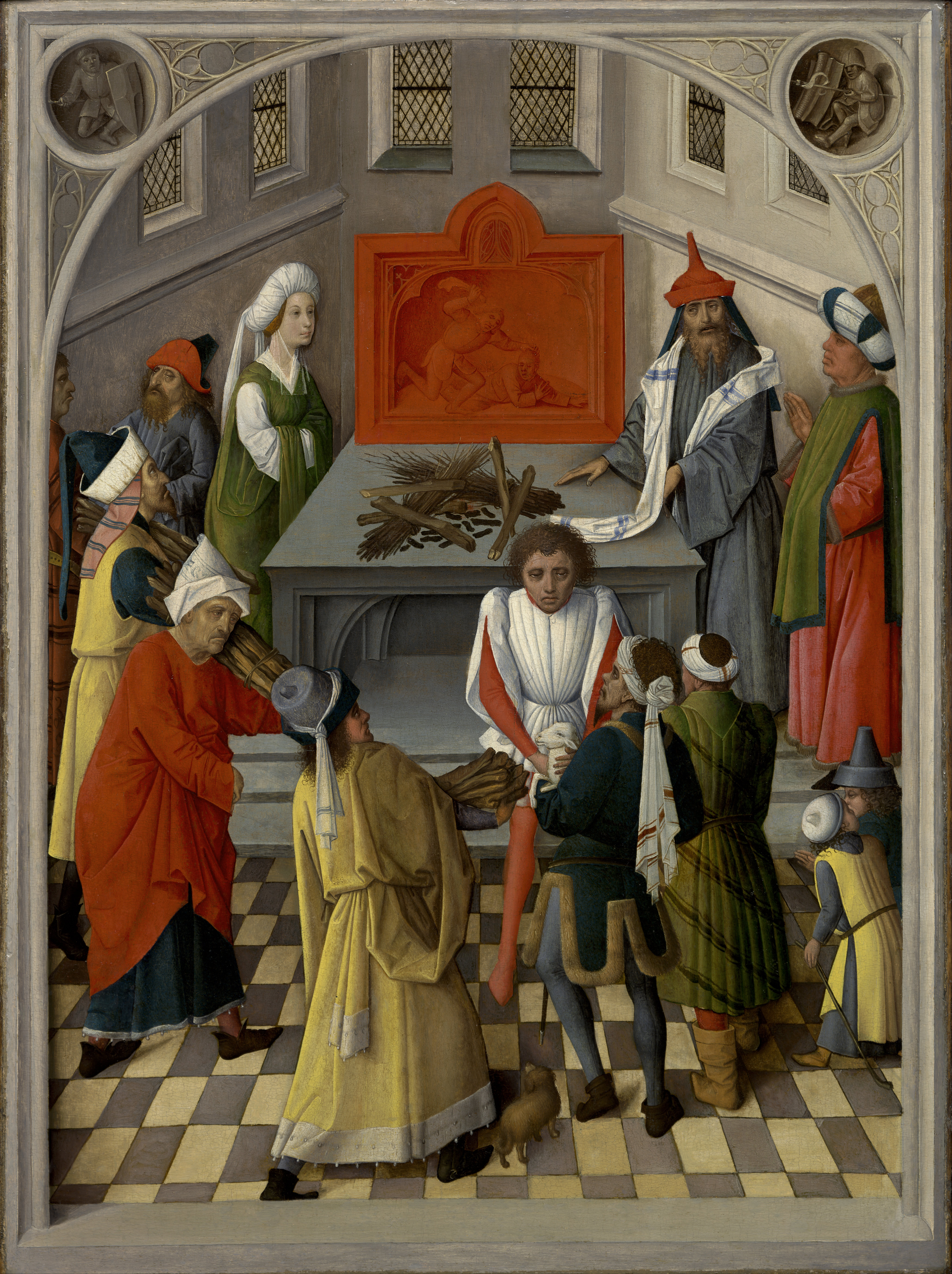
Image of Manna Gathering

The Book of Leviticus (/ləˈvɪtɪkəs/, from Ancient Greek: Λευιτικόν, Leuïtikón; Biblical Hebrew: וַיִּקְרָא, Wayyīqrāʾ, 'And He called'; Latin: Liber Leviticus) is the third book of the Torah (the Pentateuch) and of the Old Testament, also known as the Third Book of Moses. Many hypotheses presented by scholars as to its origins agree that it developed over a long period of time, reaching its present form during the Persian Period, from 538 to 332 BC, although this is disputed.

Most of its chapters (1–7, 11–27) consist of God's speeches to Moses, which he tells Moses to repeat to the Israelites. This takes place within the story of the Israelites' Exodus after they escaped Egypt and reached Mount Sinai (Exodus 19:1). The Book of Exodus narrates how Moses led the Israelites in building the Tabernacle (Exodus 35–40) with God's instructions (Exodus 25–31). In Leviticus, God tells the Israelites and their priests, Aaron and his sons, how to make offerings in the Tabernacle and how to conduct themselves while camped around the holy tent sanctuary. Leviticus takes place during the month or month-and-a-half between the completion of the Tabernacle (Exodus 40:17) and the Israelites' departure from Sinai (Numbers 1:1, 10:11).

The instructions of Leviticus emphasize ritual, legal, and moral practices rather than beliefs. Nevertheless, they reflect the world view of the creation story in Genesis 1 that God wishes to live with humans. The book teaches that faithful performance of the sanctuary rituals can make that possible, so long as the people avoid sin and impurity whenever possible. The rituals, especially the sin and guilt offerings, provide the means to gain forgiveness for sins (Leviticus 4–5) and purification from impurities (Leviticus 11–16) so that God can continue to live in the Tabernacle in the midst of the people.

== Title ==
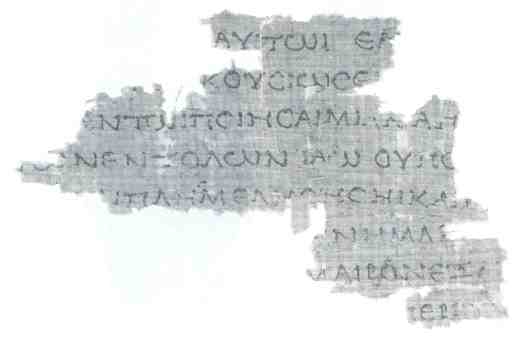
4Q120, a Greek manuscript of Leviticus from the 1st century BCE

The English name Leviticus comes from Latin Leviticus, in turn from Ancient Greek: Λευιτικόν (Leuitikon), which is the name of the book in the Septuagint. It refers to the priestly tribe of the Israelites, the Levites: the book contains the laws and rituals they perform. The Greek expression is in turn a variant of the rabbinic Hebrew torat kohanim, 'law of priests', as many of its laws relate to priests.

Consistent with the naming convention for the Pentateuch, in Hebrew the book is called Wayikra (Hebrew: וַיִּקְרָא), from the opening of the book, wa-yikra "And He [God] called."

== Structure ==
The outlines from commentaries are similar, though not identical; compare those of Wenham, Hartley, Milgrom, and Watts.

- Laws on sacrifice (chapters 1:1–7:38)
  - Instructions for the laity on bringing offerings (1:1–6:7)
    - The types of offering: burnt, cereal, peace, purification, reparation (or sin) offerings (chapters 1–5)
  - Instructions for the priests (6:1–7:38)
    - The various offerings, with the addition of the priests' cereal offering (6:1–7:36)
    - Summary (7:37–38)
- Institution of the priesthood (8:1–10:20)
  - Ordination of Aaron and his sons (chapter 8)
  - Aaron makes the first sacrifices (chapter 9)
  - Judgement on Nadab and Abihu (chapter 10)
- Uncleanliness and its treatment (11:1–15:33)
  - Unclean animals (chapter 11)
  - Childbirth as a source of uncleanliness (chapter 12)
  - Unclean diseases (chapter 13)
  - Cleansing of diseases (chapter 14)
  - Unclean discharges (chapter 15)
- Day of Atonement: purification of the tabernacle from the effects of uncleanliness and sin (chapter 16)
- Prescriptions for practical holiness (the Holiness Code, chapters 17–26)
  - Sacrifice and food (chapter 17)
  - Sexual behaviour (chapter 18)
  - Neighbourliness (chapter 19)
  - Grave crimes (chapter 20)
  - Rules for priests (chapter 21)
  - Rules for eating sacrifices (chapter 22)
  - Festivals (chapter 23)
  - Rules for the tabernacle (chapter 24:1–9)
  - Blasphemy (chapter 24:10–23)
  - Sabbatical and Jubilee years (chapter 25)
  - Exhortation to obey the law: blessing and curse (chapter 26)
- Redemption of votive gifts (chapter 27)

== Summary ==
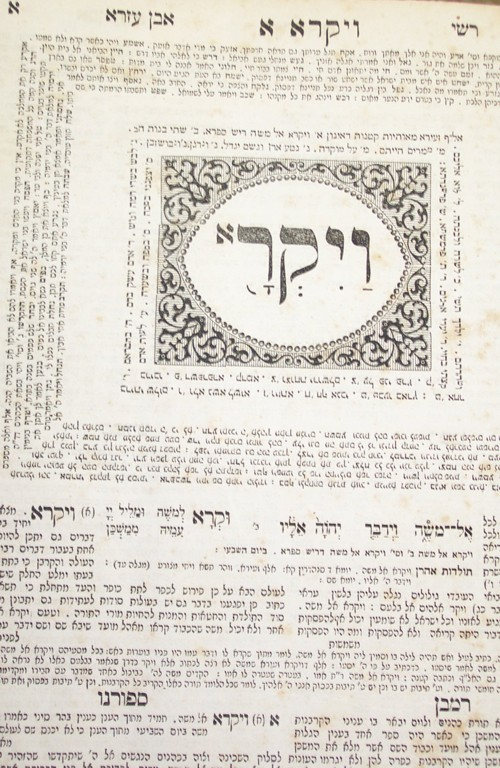
Vaikro – Book of Leviticus, Warsaw edition, 1860, page 1

Chapters 1–5 describe the various sacrifices from the sacrificers' point of view, although the priests are essential for handling the blood. Chapters 6–7 go over much the same ground, but from the point of view of the priest, who, as the one actually carrying out the sacrifice and dividing the "portions", needs to know how to do it. Sacrifices are between God, the priest, and the offers, although in some cases the entire sacrifice is a single portion to God—i.e., burnt to ashes.

Chapters 8–10 describe how Moses consecrates Aaron and his sons as the first priests, the first sacrifices, and God's destruction of two of Aaron's sons for ritual offenses. The purpose is to underline the character of altar priesthood (i.e., those priests with power to offer sacrifices to God) as an Aaronite privilege, and the responsibilities and dangers of their position.

With sacrifice and priesthood established, chapters 11–15 instruct the lay people on purity (or cleanliness). Eating certain animals produces uncleanliness, as does giving birth; certain skin diseases (but not all) are unclean, as are certain conditions affecting walls and clothing (mildew and similar conditions); and unusual bodily discharges, including female menses and male emissions (gonorrhea), are unclean. The reasoning behind the food rules are obscure; for the rest the guiding principle seems to be that all these conditions involve a loss of "life force", usually but not always blood.

Chapter 16 concerns the Day of Atonement (though that phrase appears first in 23:27). This is the only day on which the High Priest is to enter the holiest part of the sanctuary, the Holy of Holies. He is to sacrifice a bull for the sins of the priests, and a goat for the sins of the laypeople. The priest is to send a second goat into the desert to "Azazel", bearing the sins of the whole people. Azazel's identity is unknown, with some Christian tradition linking him to a fallen angel, older English Bible translations like the King James Version translating it as "a scapegoat".

Chapters 17–26 are the Holiness code. It begins with a prohibition on all unauthorized ritual slaughter of animals, and then prohibits a long list of sexual contacts and also child sacrifice. The "holiness" injunctions which give the code its name begin with the next section: there are penalties for the worship of Molech, consulting mediums and wizards, cursing one's parents and engaging in unlawful sex. Priests receive instruction on mourning rituals and acceptable bodily defects. The punishment for blasphemy is death, and there is the setting of rules for eating sacrifices; there is an explanation of the calendar, and there are rules for sabbatical and Jubilee years; there are rules for oil lamps and bread in the sanctuary; and there are rules for slavery. The code ends by telling the Israelites they must choose between the law and prosperity on the one hand, or, on the other, horrible punishments, the worst of which will be expulsion from the land.

Chapter 27 is a disparate and probably late addition telling about persons and things serving as dedication to the Lord and how one can redeem, instead of fulfill, vows.

== Composition ==
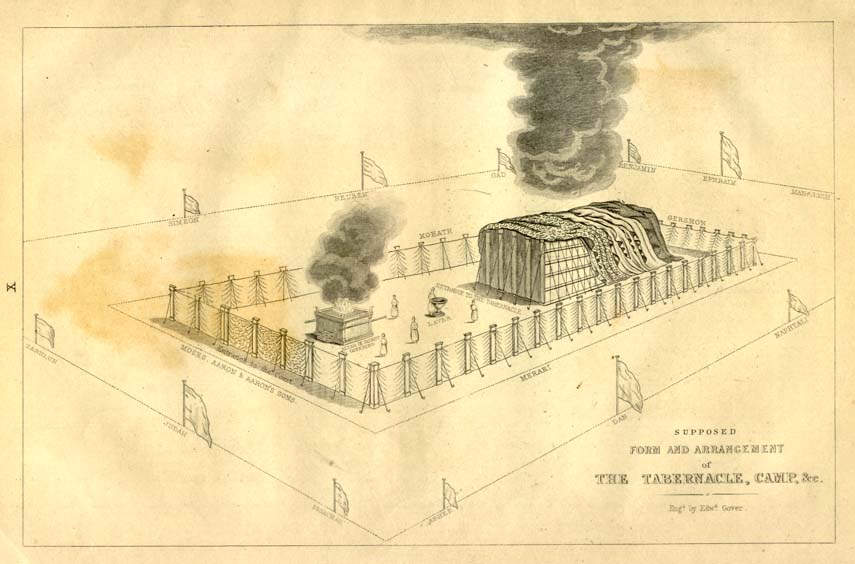
The Tabernacle and the Camp (19th-century drawing)

The majority of scholars have concluded that the Pentateuch received its final form during the Persian period (538–332 BC). Nevertheless, Leviticus had a long period of growth before reaching that form.

The entire composition of the book of Leviticus is Priestly literature. Most scholars see chapters 1–16 (the Priestly code) and chapters 17–26 (the Holiness code) as the work of two related schools, but while the Holiness material employs the same technical terms as the Priestly code, it broadens their meaning from pure ritual to the theological and moral, turning the ritual of the Priestly code into a model for the relationship of Israel to Yahweh: as the tabernacle, which is apart from uncleanliness, becomes holy by the presence of Yahweh, so he will dwell among Israel when Israel receives purification (becomes holy) and separates from other peoples. The ritual instructions in the Priestly code apparently grew from priests giving instruction and answering questions about ritual matters; the Holiness code (or H) used to be a separate document, later becoming part of Leviticus, but it seems better to think of the Holiness authors as editors who worked with the Priestly code and actually produced Leviticus as is now extant.

== Themes ==
=== Sacrifice and ritual ===
Many scholars argue that the rituals of Leviticus have a theological meaning concerning Israel's relationship with its God. Jacob Milgrom was especially influential in spreading this view. He maintained that the priestly regulations in Leviticus expressed a rational system of theological thought. The writers expected them to be put into practice in Israel's temple, so the rituals would express this theology as well, as well as ethical concern for the poor. Milgrom also argued that the book's purity regulations (chapters 11–15) have a basis in ethical thinking. Many other interpreters have followed Milgrom in exploring the theological and ethical implications of Leviticus's regulations (e.g., Marx, Balentine), though some have questioned how systematic they really are. Ritual, therefore, is not taking a series of actions for their own sake, but a means of maintaining the relationship between God, humanity, and the world.

=== Priesthood ===
The main function of the priests is service at the altar, and only the sons of Aaron are priests in the full sense. (Ezekiel also distinguishes between altar-priests and lower Levites, but in Ezekiel the altar-priests are sons of Zadok instead of sons of Aaron; many scholars see this as a remnant of struggles between different priestly factions in First Temple times, finding resolution by the Second Temple into a hierarchy of Aaronite altar-priests and lower-level Levites, including singers, gatekeepers and the like.)

In chapter 10, God kills Nadab and Abihu, the oldest sons of Aaron, for offering "strange incense". Aaron has two sons left. Commentators have read various messages in the incident: a reflection of struggles between priestly factions in the post-Exilic period (Gerstenberger); or a warning against offering incense outside the Temple, where there might be the risk of invoking strange gods (Milgrom). In any case, there has been a pollution of the sanctuary by the bodies of the two dead priests, leading into the next theme, holiness.

=== Uncleanliness and purity ===
Ritual purity is essential for an Israelite to be able to approach Yahweh and remain part of the community. Uncleanliness threatens holiness; chapters 11–15 review the various causes of uncleanliness and describe the rituals which will restore cleanliness; one is to maintain cleanliness through observation of the rules on sexual behaviour, family relations, land ownership, worship, sacrifice, and observance of holy days.

Yahweh dwells with Israel in the Tabernacle. All of the priestly ritual focuses on Yahweh and the construction and maintenance of a holy space, but sin generates impurity, as do everyday events such as childbirth and menstruation; impurity pollutes the holy dwelling place. Failure to purify the sacred space ritually could result in God's leaving, which would be disastrous.

=== Infectious diseases in chapter 13 ===
In chapter 13, God instructs Moses and Aaron on how to identify infectious diseases and deal with them accordingly. The translators and interpreters of the Hebrew Bible in various languages have never reached a consensus on these infectious diseases, or tzaraath (צרעת), and the translation and interpretation of the scriptures are not known for certain. The most common translation is that these infectious diseases are leprosy; however, what is described in chapter 13 does not represent a typical manifestation of leprosy. Modern dermatology shows that many of the infectious diseases in chapter 13 were likely dermatophytoses, a group of highly contagious skin diseases.

The infectious disease of the chin described in verses 29–37 seems to be Tinea barbae in men or Tinea faciei in women; the infectious disease described in verses 29–37 (as resulting in hair loss and eventual baldness) seems to be Tinea capitis (Favus). Verses 1–17 seem to describe Tinea corporis.

The Hebrew word bohaq in verses 38–39 is translated as 'tetter' or 'freckles', likely because translators did not know what it meant at the time, and thus, translated it incorrectly. Later translations identify it as talking about vitiligo; however, vitiligo is not an infectious disease. The disease, described as healing itself and leaving white patches after infection, is likely to be pityriasis versicolor (tinea versicolor). Tetter originally referred to an outbreak, which later evolved meaning ringworm-like lesions. Therefore, a common name for Tinea pedis (athlete's foot) was Cantlie's foot tetter. In addition, verses 18–23 describe infections after scald, and verses 24–28 describe infections after burn.

=== Atonement ===
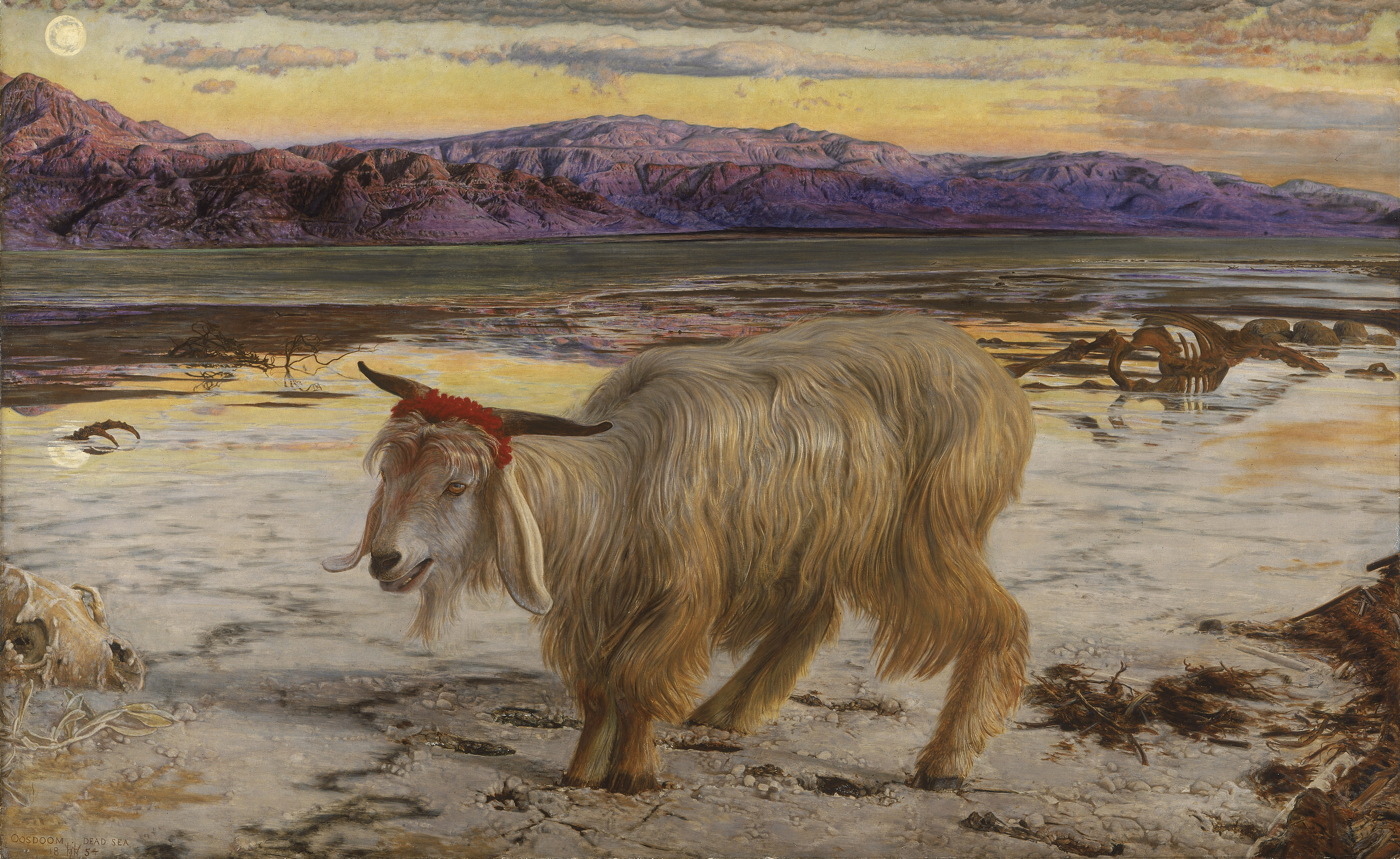
The Scapegoat (1854 painting by William Holman Hunt)

Through sacrifice, the priest "makes atonement" for sin and the offeror receives forgiveness (but only if Yahweh accepts the sacrifice). Atonement rituals involve the pouring or sprinkling of blood as the symbol of the life of the victim: the blood has the power to wipe out or absorb the sin. The two-part division of the book structurally reflects the role of atonement: chapters 1–16 call for the establishment of the institution for atonement, and chapters 17–27 call for the life of the atoned community in holiness.

=== Holiness ===
The consistent theme of chapters 17–26 is in the repetition of the phrase, "Be holy, for I the Lord your God am holy." Holiness in ancient Israel and the Hebrew Bible had a different meaning than in contemporary usage: it might have been regarded as the essence of Yahweh, an invisible but physical and potentially dangerous force. Specific objects, or even days, can be holy, but they derive holiness from being connected with Yahweh—the seventh day, the tabernacle, and the priests all derive their holiness from him. As a result, Israel had to maintain its own holiness in order to live safely alongside God.

The need for holiness is for the possession of the Promised Land (Canaan), where the Jews will become a holy people: "You shall not do as they do in the land of Egypt where you dwelt, and you shall not do as they do in the land of Canaan to which I am bringing you [...] You shall do my ordinances and keep my statutes [...] I am the Lord, your God." (Leviticus 18:3).

== Subsequent tradition ==
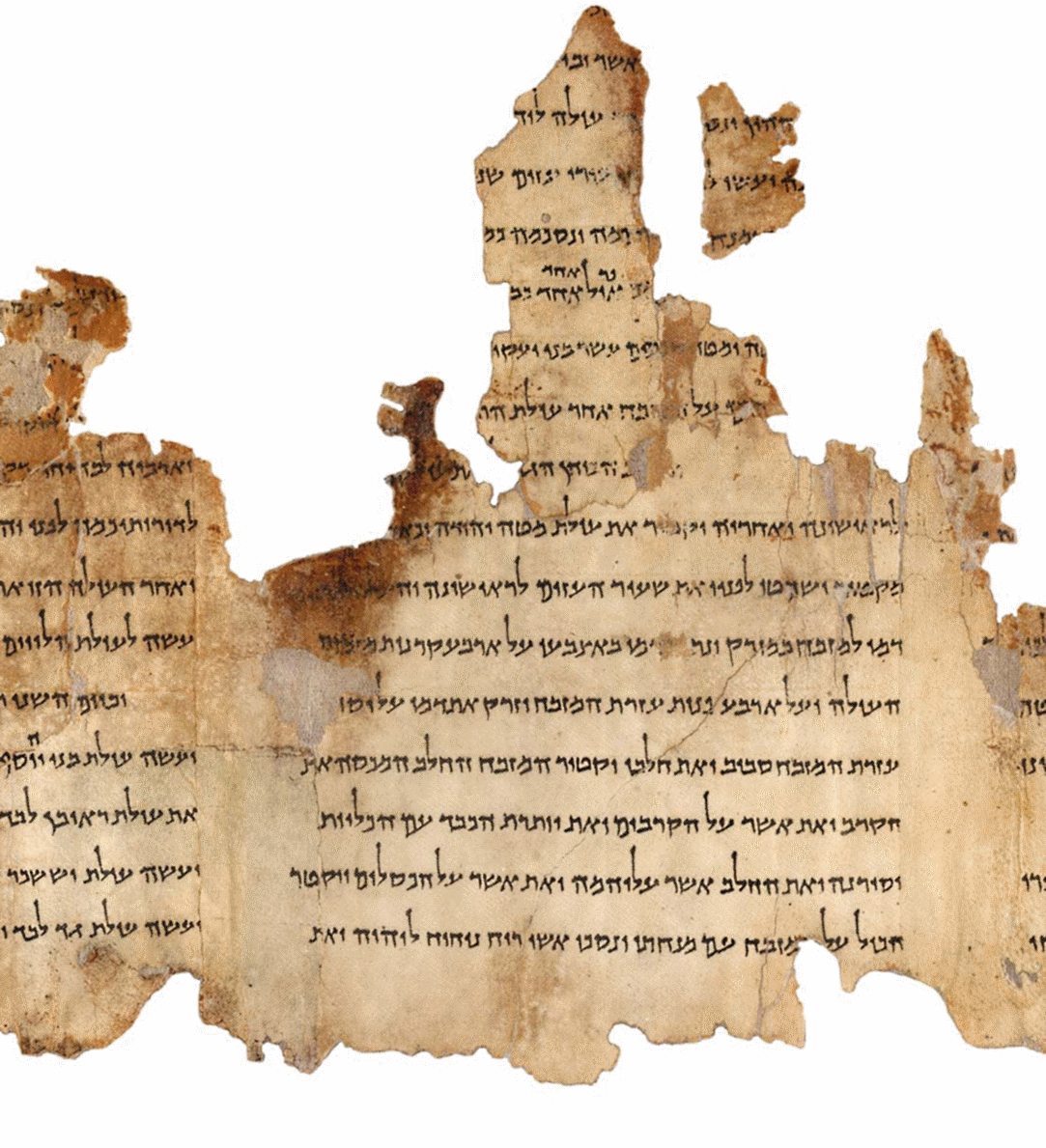
Portion of the Temple Scroll

Leviticus, as part of the Torah, became the law book of Jerusalem's Second Temple as well as of the Samaritan temple. Its influence is evident among the Dead Sea Scrolls, which included fragments of seventeen manuscripts of Leviticus dating from the 3rd to the 1st centuries BC. Many other Qumran scrolls cite the book, especially the Temple Scroll and 4QMMT.

Jews and Christians have not observed Leviticus's instructions for animal offerings since the 1st century AD, following the destruction of the Second Temple in Jerusalem in 70 AD. As there was no longer a Temple at which to offer animal sacrifices, Judaism pivoted towards prayer and the study of the Torah, eventually giving rise to Rabbinic Judaism. Nevertheless, Leviticus constitutes a major source of Jewish law and is traditionally the first book children learn in the Rabbinic system of education. There are two main Midrashim on Leviticus—the halakhic one (Sifra) and a more aggadic one (Vayikra Rabbah).

The New Testament, particularly the Epistle to the Hebrews, uses ideas and images from Leviticus to describe Jesus as the high priest who offers his own blood as a sin offering. Therefore, Christians do not make animal offerings either, because as Gordon Wenham summarized: "With the death of Christ the only sufficient 'burnt offering' was offered once and for all, and therefore the animal sacrifices which foreshadowed Christ's sacrifice were made obsolete."

Christians generally have the view that the New Covenant supersedes the Old Testament's ritual laws, which includes some of the rules in Leviticus. Christians, therefore, do not usually follow Leviticus' rules regarding diet purity, and agriculture. Christian teachings have differed, however, as to where to draw the line between ritual and moral regulations. In Homilies on Leviticus, the third century theologian, Origen, expounded on the qualities of priests as models for Christians to be perfect in everything, strict, wise and to examine themselves individually, forgive sins, and convert sinners (by words and by doctrine).

== Weekly Torah portions ==
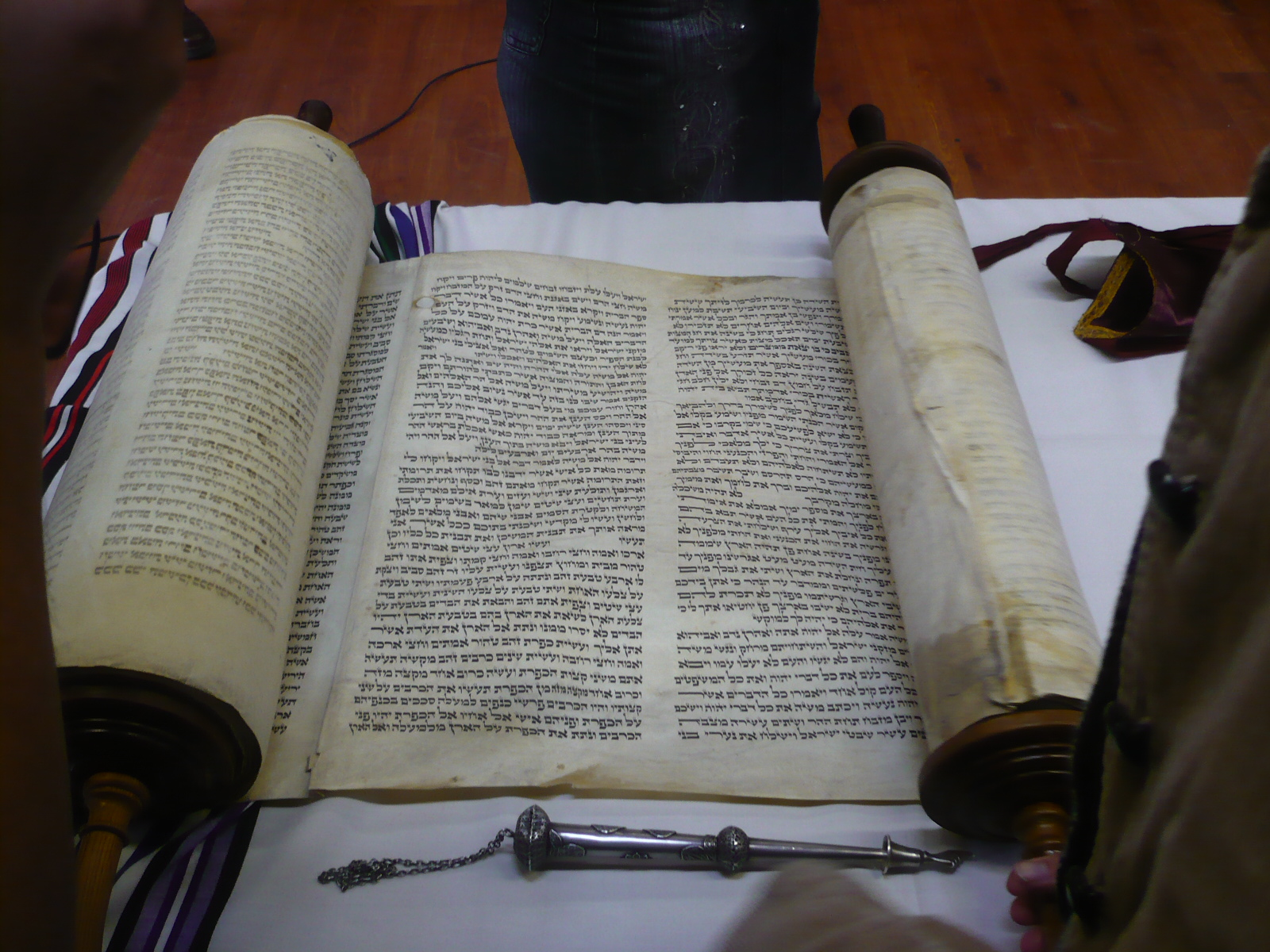
A Torah scroll and silver pointer (yad) used in reading

For detailed contents, see:

- Vayikra, on Leviticus 1–5: Laws of the sacrifices
- Tzav, on Leviticus 6–8: Sacrifices, ordination of the priests
- Shemini, on Leviticus 9–11: Consecration of tabernacle, alien fire, dietary laws
- Tazria, on Leviticus 12–13: Childbirth, skin disease, clothing
- Metzora, on Leviticus 14–15: Skin disease, unclean houses, genital discharges
- Acharei Mot, on Leviticus 16–18: Yom Kippur, centralized offerings, sexual practices
- Kedoshim, on Leviticus 19–20: Holiness, penalties for transgressions
- Emor, on Leviticus 21–24: Rules for priests, holy days, lights and bread, a blasphemer
- Behar, on Leviticus 25: Sabbatical year, debt servitude limited
- Bechukotai, on Leviticus 26–27: Blessings and curses, payment of vows

== See also ==
- 613 commandments
- En-Gedi Scroll
- Liberty Bell – inscribed with a quotation from Leviticus

== Bibliography ==
=== Translations of Leviticus ===
- Leviticus at Bible gateway

=== Commentaries on Leviticus ===
- Balentine, Samuel E (2002). Leviticus. Westminster John Knox Press. ISBN 978-0-664-23735-6.
- Bamberger, Bernard Jacob The Torah: A Modern Commentary (1981), ISBN 978-0-8074-0055-5
- Gerstenberger, Erhard S (1996). Leviticus: A Commentary. Westminster John Knox Press. ISBN 978-0-664-22673-2.
- Gorman, Frank H (1997). Divine Presence and Community: A Commentary on the Book of Leviticus. Eerdmans. ISBN 978-0-8028-0110-4.
- Grabbe, Lester (1998). "Leviticus". In John Barton (ed.). Oxford Bible Commentary. Oxford University Press. ISBN 978-0-19-875500-5.
- Hartley, John E. (1992). Leviticus. Word. ISBN 978-0-8499-0203-1.
- Houston, Walter J. (2003). "Leviticus". In James D. G. Dunn, John William Rogerson (ed.). Eerdmans Bible Commentary. Eerdmans. ISBN 978-0-8028-3711-0.
- Kleinig, John W (2004). Leviticus. Concordia Publishing House. ISBN 978-0-570-06317-9.
- Levine, Baruch A. (1989). JPS Torah Commentary: Leviticus. Jewish Publication Society. Archived from the original on 5 August 2016.
- Milgrom, Jacob (1998–2001). Leviticus 1–16, Leviticus 17–22, Leviticus 23–27. New Haven: Yale.
- Milgrom, Jacob (2004). Leviticus: A Book of Ritual and Ethics. Minneapolis: Fortress. ISBN 978-1-4514-1015-0.
- Watts, James W. (2013). Leviticus 1–10. Leuven: Peeters. ISBN 978-90-429-2984-5.
- Wenham, Gordon (1979). The Book of Leviticus. Eerdmans. ISBN 978-0-8028-2522-3.

=== General ===
- Balentine, Samuel E (1999). The Torah's Vision of Worship. Fortress Press. ISBN 978-1-4514-1808-8.
- Bandstra, Barry L (2004). Reading the Old Testament: An Introduction to the Hebrew Bible. Wadsworth. ISBN 978-0-495-39105-0.
- Berlin, Adele; Brettler, Marc Zvi (2014). Jewish Study Bible (2 Rev ed. (November 2014) ed.). [S.l.]: Oxford University Press. ISBN 978-0-19-997846-5.
- Brueggemann, Walter (2002). Reverberations of Faith: A Theological Handbook of Old Testament Themes. Westminster John Knox. ISBN 978-0-664-22231-4.
- Campbell, Antony F; O'Brien, Mark A (1993). Sources of the Pentateuch: Texts, Introductions, Annotations. Fortress Press. ISBN 978-1-4514-1367-0.
- Clines, David A (1997). The Theme of the Pentateuch. Sheffield Academic Press. ISBN 978-0-567-43196-7.
- Davies, Philip R; Rogerson, John W (2005). The Old Testament World. Liturgical Press. ISBN 978-0-664-23025-8.
- Dawes, Gregory W (2005). Introduction to the Bible. Liturgical Press. ISBN 978-0-8146-2835-5.
- Gilbert, Christopher (2009). A Complete Introduction to the Bible. Paulist Press. ISBN 978-0-8091-4552-2.
- Grabbe, Lester (2006). "The priests in Leviticus". In Rolf Rendtorff, Robert A. Kugler (ed.). The Book of Leviticus: Composition and Reception. Brill. ISBN 978-90-04-12634-3.
- Greidanus, Sidney (2021). Preaching Christ from Leviticus. Eerdmans Publishing. ISBN 978-0-8028-7602-7.
- Knierim, Rolf P (1995). The Task of Old Testament Theology: Substance, Method, and Cases. Eerdmans. ISBN 978-0-8028-0715-1.
- Kugler, Robert; Hartin, Patrick (2009). An Introduction to the Bible. Eerdmans. ISBN 978-0-8028-4636-5.
- Levine, Baruch (2006). "Leviticus: Its Literary History and Location in Biblical Literature". In Rolf Rendtorff, Robert A. Kugler (ed.). The Book of Leviticus: Composition and Reception. Brill. ISBN 978-90-04-12634-3.
- Marx, Alfred (2006). "The Theology of the Sacrifice according to Leviticus 1–7". In Rolf Rendtorff, Robert A. Kugler (ed.). The Book of Leviticus: Composition and Reception. Brill. ISBN 978-90-04-12634-3.
- McDermott, John J (2002). Reading the Pentateuch: A Historical Introduction. Pauline Press. ISBN 978-0-8091-4082-4.
- Newsom, Carol Ann (2004). The Self as Symbolic Space: Constructing Identity and Community at Qumran. BRILL. ISBN 978-90-04-13803-2.
- Nihan, Christophe (2007). From Priestly Torah to Pentateuch: A Study in the Composition of the Book of Leviticus. Tuebingen: Mohr Siebeck. ISBN 978-3-16-149257-0.
- Rodd, Cyril S (2001). Glimpses of a Strange Land: Studies in Old Testament Ethics. T&T Clark. ISBN 978-0-567-08753-9.
- Rogerson, J.W. (1991). Genesis 1–11. T&T Clark. ISBN 978-0-567-08338-8.
- Van Seters, John (1998). "The Pentateuch". In Steven L. McKenzie, Matt Patrick Graham (ed.). The Hebrew Bible Today: An Introduction to Critical Issues. Westminster John Knox Press. ISBN 978-0-664-25652-4.
- Ska, Jean-Louis (2006). Introduction to Reading the Pentateuch. Eisenbrauns. ISBN 978-1-57506-122-1.
- Watts, James W. (2007). Ritual and Rhetoric in Leviticus: From Sacrifice to Scripture. New York: Cambridge. ISBN 978-0-521-87193-8.
- Wenham, Gordon (2003). Exploring the Old Testament: The Pentateuch. SPCK.

Book of Leviticus Pentateuch
Preceded by Exodus	Hebrew Bible	Succeeded by Numbers
Preceded by Exodus	Christian; Old Testament	Succeeded by Numbers
