= David Gruby =

Hungarian physician

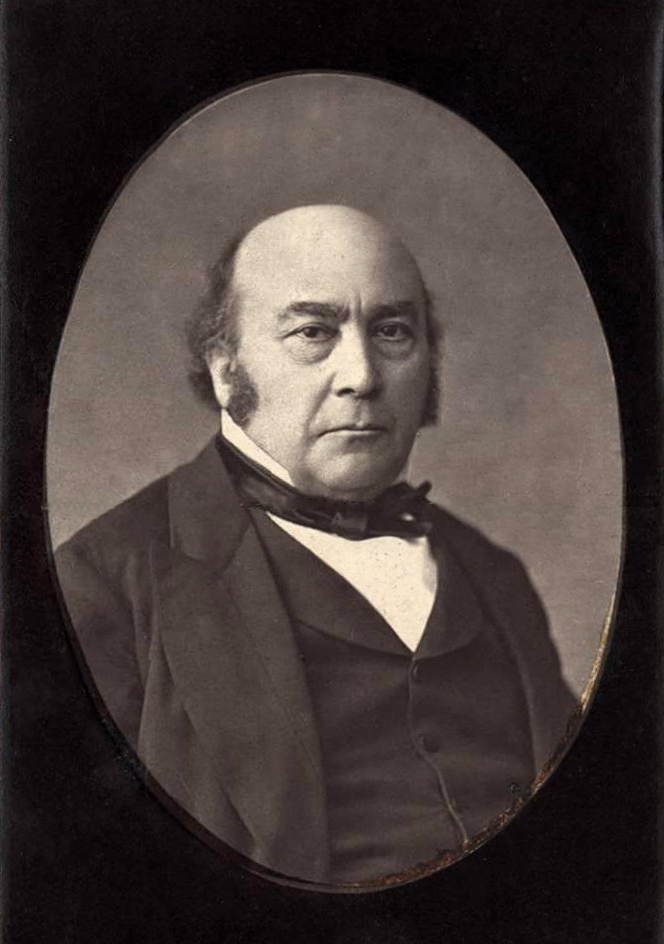
- David Gruby, ca. 1880s
- Born: 20 August 1810
- Died: 14 November 1898 (aged 88)

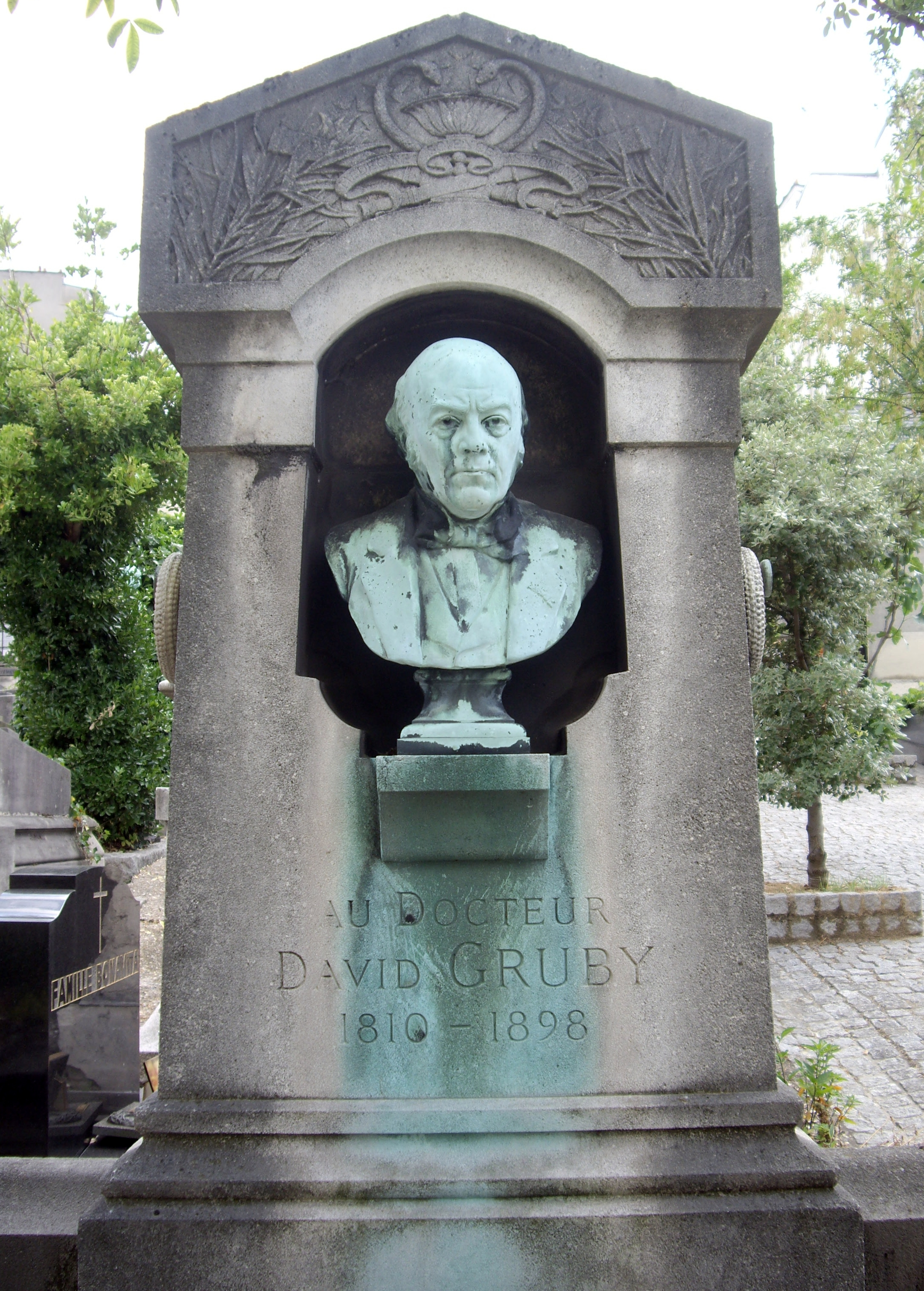
Grave of David Gruby, Saint-Vincent Cemetery, Montmartre

David Gruby (20 August 1810 – 14 November 1898) was a Hungarian physician born in the village of Kis-Kér (now Bačko Dobro Polje, Serbia) to a Jewish farmer. He received his doctorate in Vienna and performed scientific research in Paris.

Gruby is remembered as a pioneer in the fields of microbiology and medical mycology. Most of his important work was done during the 1840s, when he reported that human disease could be caused by fungi. In 1841 he described the fungus associated with favus, a discovery that was independent of Johann Lukas Schönlein's (1793–1864) findings. Later, the fungal parasite was called Achorion schoenleinii in Schönlein's honor.

In 1842 he described a microscopic cryptogam (Trichophyton ectothrix) that is associated with a dermatological disease known as sycosis barbae. Gruby also discovered Candida (Monilia) albicans, the cause of candidiasis, and in 1843 he described a fungus (Microsporum audouinii) that is the cause of a type of ringworm. This fungus was named after naturalist Jean Victor Audouin (1797–1842).

Gruby also discovered a parasite in the blood of frogs he called Trypanosoma sanguinis. During the early years of anaesthesia, he performed important experiments with chloroform and ether on animals.

== Associated eponym ==
- "Gruby's disease": Tinea capitis in children caused by an infection with Trichophyton tonsurans.

== Written works ==
- Mémoire sur une vegétation qui constitue la vraie teigne. (discovery & description of the achorion of favus)
- Recherches anatomiques sun une plante cryptogame qui constitue le vrai muguet des enfants (discussion of albicans in thrush)
- Sur une espèce de mentagre contagieuse résultant du développement d'un nouveau cryptogame dans la racine des poils de la barbe de l'homme. (description of Trichophyton mentagrophytes, the cause of sycosis barbae)
- Recherches sur la nature, le siège et le développement du Porrigo decalvans ou phytoalopécie (concerning the study of Microsporon audouini)
- Recherches sur les cryptogames qui constituent la maladie contagieuse du cuir chevelu sous le nom de Teigne (Trichophyton tonsurans, in ringworm of the scalp).
