= Irritant folliculitis =

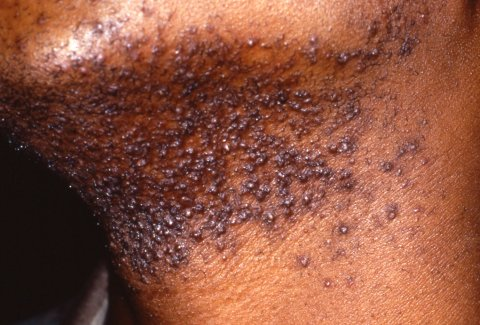
- Pseudofolliculitis barbae: a type of irritant folliculitis
- Specialty: Dermatology
- Symptoms: Small red bumps in skin
- Usual onset: Any age
- Types: Pseudofolliculitis barbae
- Causes: Occlusion, friction, hair removal, application of some medications, contact with irritant chemicals
- Risk factors: Obesity
- Diagnostic method: Visualisation, history, negative microbiological culture
- Treatment: Avoid trigger, tetracycline

Irritant folliculitis is an inflammation of the hair follicle. It characteristically presents with small red bumps in the skin at sites of occlusion, pressure, friction, or hair removal; typically around the beard area in males, pubic area and lower legs of females, or generally the inner thighs and bottom. An associated itch may or may not be present. Pseudofolliculitis barbae is a type of irritant folliculitis in the beard area.

Mechanical factors that typically trigger irritant folliculitis include hair removal by razor, waxing, electrolysis, and by plucking. Repeated rubbing of skin such as friction on the inner thighs, may result in the irritation. Sunlight, and prolonged pressure such as sitting on one's bottom for long periods of time, may also trigger irritant folliculitis. Irritant folliculitis may occur following the use of some medications or contact with irritant chemicals such as cutting fluids and coal tar. Tight hair styles may cause irritant folliculitis on the scalp. Other factors that increase chances of skin friction and moisture include obesity.

Diagnosis is generally by history and visualisation of the rash. The condition is not due to infection and swabs of the spots are typically negative. It may appear similar to acne and other types of infectious folliculitis.

Treatment considers removing the triggering factor, particularly to stop shaving. Prolonged use of the antibiotic doxycycline may be an option. If shaving is necessary, the condition may be prevented by avoiding soap and applying a generous amount of shaving gel. Rubbing may be reduced by using powders.

Any age may be affected. It is common on the lower legs of women who shave there.

== Definition and types ==
Irritant folliculitis is a type of folliculitis, an inflammation of the hair follicle, not caused by infection. Types include pseudofolliculitis barbae and perioral dermatitis.

== Signs and symptoms ==
The condition characteristically presents with small red bumps in the skin at sites of occlusion, pressure, friction, or hair removal; typically around the beard area in males, pubic area and lower legs of females, or generally the inner thighs and bottom. An associated itch may or may not be present.

== Cause ==
Mechanical factors that typically trigger irritant folliculitis include hair removal by razor, waxing, electrolysis, and by plucking. Other triggers may include sunlight, prolonged pressure such as sitting on one's bottom for long periods of time, and contact with chemicals such as cutting fluids and coal tar. Lithium, halogens, corticosteroids, ACTH, isoniazid, phenytoin and some TNF-alpha inhibitors may cause irritant folliculitis. Perioral dermatitis typically occurs following prolonged use of topical corticosteroid to face. Tight hair styles may cause irritant folliculitis on the scalp. Thick greasy moisturisers may trigger the condition. Other factors that increase chances of skin friction and moisture include obesity.

== Diagnosis ==
Diagnosis is by history and visualisation of the rash. A swab for culture does not grow bacteria or fungi.

=== Differential diagnosis ===
Pseudofolliculitis barbae may be distinguished from infectious causes folliculitis of the beard area by the absence of fever and lymphadenopathy and the tendency to be more diffuse than localised.

== Treatment ==
Treatment involves removing the triggering factor, particularly shaving. Sometimes doxycycline works as an anti-inflammatory medication. Ceasing to shave for several months may help. If shaving is necessary, the condition may be prevented by avoiding soap and applying a generous amount of shaving gel after a few months of stopping shaving and letting the skin settle. Rubbing may be reduced by using powders.

== Epidemiology ==
Any age may be affected. It is common on the lower legs of women who shave there.

== See also ==
- List of cutaneous conditions
