= Lupoid sycosis =

- Specialty: Dermatology

Lupoid sycosis is a cutaneous condition that is characterized by a scarring form of deep folliculitis, typically affecting the beard area.

== See also ==
- Sycosis barbae
- List of cutaneous conditions
