= AKN =

AKN may refer to:

- Akn (Armenian: Ակն), a town in Eastern Anatolia, Turkey
- King Salmon Airport, Bristol Bay Borough, Alaska, US, IATA code
- AKN Eisenbahn, rail operator in Hamburg and Schleswig-Holstein
- AKN format (.akn), an XML format for government documents
- Acne keloidalis nuchae, a skin condition
- A US Navy hull classification symbol: Net cargo ship (AKN)
