= Triska =

Triska, Tříska or Tříška is a surname. In Czech it is derived from tříska, meaning "sliver" or "splinter", and originally a name for a thin person. The name may refer to:

- Jan Tříska (1936–2017), Czech actor
- Kristina Triska (born 1980), Swedish tennis player
