= Lyubov Yablochnik =

Russian microbiologist

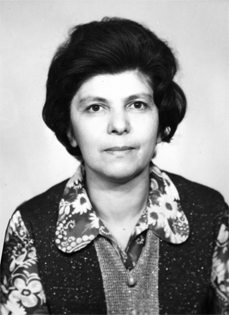
- Born: December 8, 1928; Bryansk, Russia
- Died: September 22, 2013 (aged 84); New York, New York, United States
- Citizenship: Soviet Union, Russia, United States
- Education: Moscow Institute of Chemical Technology of the meat industry Soviet Union
- Known for: One of the developers of the world's first antifungal vaccine
- Awards: The first woman scientist from the Soviet Union awarded the gold medal of the World Intellectual Property Organization
- Scientific career
- Fields: Mycotoxicology, Mycology, Veterinary Microbiology
- Workplaces: All-Russian Research Institute of Experimental Veterinary Medicine, Russia; All-Union State Scientific Control Institute of Veterinary Preparations (VGNKI), Russia
- Thesis: Immunity in cattle trichophytosis (1968)
- Academic advisors: Arutjun K. Sarkisov

Lyubov Yablochnik (Russian: Любовь Марковна Яблочник; December 8, 1928 – September 22, 2013) was a Soviet and Russian veterinary microbiologist.

== Life and career ==
Lyubov Markovna Yablochnik was born in 1928 in Bryansk, Soviet Union. In 1951 she graduated from the Moscow State University of Food Production and worked as a veterinary physician in Krasnoyarsk Krai until 1954.

From 1957 to 1960, she was a junior research fellow in the M. P. Chumakov Institute of Poliomyelitis and Viral Encephalitis (Moscow, USSR) and from 1960 to 1963 she worked as a microbiologist engineer at Moskhimfarmpreparaty OAO Im. N.A. Semashko.

In 1963 Yablochnik moved to more advanced scientific work. She took a course in microbiology at the First Moscow State Medical University, and then entered the postgraduate program of the All-Russian Scientific Research Institute of Experimental Veterinary Medicine (VIEV) in the laboratory of mycology and antibiotics.

From 1966 onwards, Yablochnik worked as a researcher, and in 1973 became Senior Researcher at the All-Russian Scientific Research Institute of Experimental Veterinary Medicine.

At the end of 1973, she transferred to the All-Union State Research Control Institute for Veterinary Preparations (VGNKI) as a senior researcher in the laboratory of antibiotics. In 1978, she led development of a new laboratory for the control and standardization of preparations against mycoses and she headed it from 1981 to 1989. From 1989 to 1993 Yablochnik was a leading researcher in the laboratory for the control and standardization of probiotics, drugs against coccal infections and mycoses.

She had married and had two children by 1963. In 1993, Lyubov moved with her family to the US and lived in the states of New York and New Jersey until her death in 2013.

== Research on prevention of ringworm in cattle ==
Yablochnik's postgraduate study in the laboratory of mycology and antibiotics at VIEV led to her work on mycoses (diseases of animals caused by parasitic fungus). Her supervisor A. Sarkisov directed her doctoral project to the study of immunity in cattle infected with the skin disease ringworm, of economic importance since it can spoil milk, meat, and leather quality. Her studies showed that animals that had recovered from the disease did not become ill after reinfection and therefore indicated a route to prevention of the disease.

From 1969 Yablochnik was a leading part of the team that developed an antifungal vaccine from this observation. A live, attenuated culture of Trichophyton verrucosum TF-130 was developed as an immunogenic treatment, applied by inoculation into the skin and its intellectual property was protected with patents in the USSR and other countries. After improving the shelf life, a new version LTF-130 was made available. As a result of immunization of cattle in the Soviet Union with the new vaccine LTF-130, between 1968 and 1978 the incidence of the disease was reduced more than 100-fold. This was a very significant improvement in disease control and replaced the used of topical and oral antimycotic treatments.

The LTF-130 vaccine continues to be by far the most effective biological treatment to prevent cattle ringworm. As an example, through using LTF-130 trichophytosis in Norway has gone from an endemic notifiable disease affecting 1.7% new cattle herds annually in 1980 to only being reported from 0.043% new herds in 2004 and none in 2009. By 2012 only two herds were affected.

This work was awarded a USSR State Prize in 1973. In 1983 the LTF-130 vaccine's developers (A. K. Sarkisov, L. M. Yablochnik, S. V. Petrovich and L. I. Nikiforov) were awarded a gold medal for the "Best invention of practical use to developing countries" by the World Intellectual Property Organization (WIPO). Yablochnik was the first female scientist from the Soviet Union to receive this award.

== Publications and patents ==
- Yablochnik L. M. "Experimental study of immunity in trichophytia guinea pigs" (in Russian). // Bulletin of VIEV - Moscow., 1967. - T.2.- P. 96–100.
- Yablochnik L. M. "Immunity in cattle trichophytosis: Dissertation of the candidate veterinary sciences" (in Russian) // Bulletin of VIEV - Moscow., 1968. - P. 20.
- USSR Inventor's Certificate No. 268593 for "Method of Specific Prophylaxis of Cattle Trichophytosis", 1970.
- Sarkisov, S. V. Petrovitch, L. I. Nikiforov, L. M. Yablochnik, V. P. Koroleva "Immunization of Cattle against Trichophytosis", J. Veterinary, 1971, 2, 54-56 (in Russian).
- Yablochnik L. "Immunity in cattle trichophytosis". // Bulletin of VIEV - Moscow, 1972 - Выпуск 12 - P. 15–16.
- Patent DK138803B: A process for the preparation of a vaccine for the treatment of cattle against trichophytose. Inventor: Arutjun Khristoforovi Sarkisov, Svyatoslav Vsevolodo Petrovich, Lev Ivanovich Nikiforov, Ljubov Markovna Yablochnik. Original Assignee: V Iex Veterinarii. Priority date: May 29, 1972
- Patent CA-984749-A: Method for producing preparation for prophylaxis of trichophytosis in cattle. Arutjun K. Sarkisov, Svyatoslav V. Petrovich, Lev I. Nikiforov, Ljubov M. Yablochnik. Vsesojuzny Ordena Lenina Institut Experimentalnoi Veterinarii. March 2, 1976
- USSR Inventor's Certificate No. №955570. A method of manufacturing a vaccine against trichophytia cattle. Priority date: March 26, 1980, Publication date: November 7, 1984. Inventor:: А.Х. Саркисов, Л.М. Яблочник, Л.И. Никифоров, C.B. Петрович, К.П. Летягин, Т.Н. Мохина, Г.Ф. Денисенко, И.И. Жарков, В.Ф. Ковалев, Ю.П. Чернецкий.
- USSR Inventor's Certificate №955571. Vaccine TF-130 (k) against cattle trichophytia and method of prophylaxis for cattle trichophytia treatment. Priority date: March 28, 1980, Publication date: November 7, 1984. Inventor: А.Х. Саркисов, Л.М. Яблочник, С.В. Петрович, Л.И. Никифоров, И.И. Жарков, К.П. Летягин, Х.А. Джилавян, В.Г. Мельник.
- Patent RU2013444C1 Strain of trichophyton mentagrophytes used for control of immunogenic activity of animal trichophytosis vaccines. Priority date: December 30, 1992. Publication date: May 30, 1994. Inventor: Л.М. Яблочник, А.Н. Панин, И.И. Жарков, К.П. Летягин.
- Patent RU2013445C1. Strain of trichophyton mentagrophytes used for preparation of animal trichophytosis vaccine. Priority date: December 30, 1992. Publication date: May 30, 1994. Inventor: Л.М. Яблочник, А.Н. Панин, К.П. Летягин, К.А. Саркисов.
- Patent RU2018321C1; WO9415632-A1; AU9458245-A. Vaccine against trichophytosis in animals. Priority date: December 30, 1992. Publication date: August 30, 1994. Inventor: Ljubov Markovna Yablochnik, Karen Artemovich Sarkisov, Konstantin Pavlovich Letyagin, Alexandr Nikolaevich Panin
- Patent RU2074251C1 Strain of fungus trichophyton verrucosum used for preparing vaccine against animal dermatophytosis. Priority date: July 1, 1994. Publication date: February 27, 1997. Inventor: К.П. Летягин, Т.Н. Мохина, Л.М. Яблочник, А.Н. Панин, К.А. Саркисов

== Awards and recognition ==
- Recipients of the USSR State Prize (1973) - for the creation of a highly effective prophylactic drug TF-130 (vaccine) against ringworm cattle, the development of its production technology, the development of industrial production and the introduction into widespread veterinary practice.
- WIPO Gold Medal. (June 1983) Invention: Method for production and use of the vaccine LTF-130, intended for prevention and treatment of cattle skin disease (Trichophytia). Prof. A.Kh.Sarkisov, Mr. S.V. Petrovich and Mr. L.I. Nikiforov were also part of the team that made this invention.
- VDNKh (Russia). Gold Medal.
