= Ingrown hair =

- Other names: hair bump
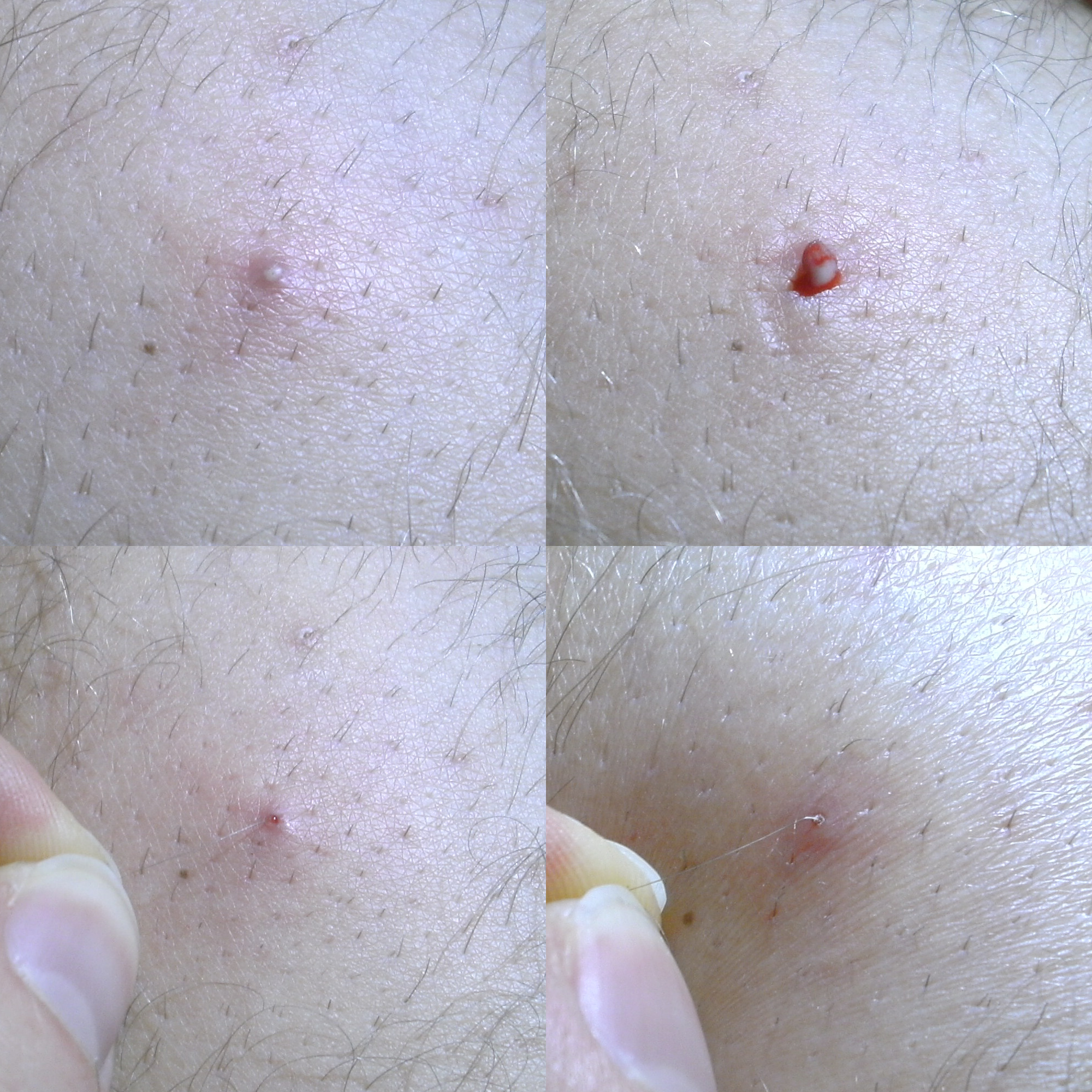
- An ingrown hair
- Specialty: Dermatology
- Complications: boil

Ingrown hair is a condition where a hair curls back or grows sideways into the skin. The condition is most prevalent among people who have coarse or curly hair. It may or may not be accompanied by an infection of the hair follicle (folliculitis) or "razor bumps" (pseudofolliculitis barbae), which vary in size. While ingrown hair most commonly appears in areas where the skin is shaved or waxed (beard, legs, pubic region), it can appear anywhere. Anything that causes the hair to be broken off unevenly with a sharp tip can cause ingrown hairs. Ingrown hairs are also caused because of lack of natural exfoliation in the skin.

== Signs and symptoms ==
Signs and symptoms of ingrown hair include rash, itching skin, and hair that remains despite shaving. The site of the ingrown hair forms a reddish, raised bump, similar in appearance to a pimple.

== Prevention ==
When shaving, a few precautions can be taken to prevent ingrown hairs. When shaving, applying the proper amount of lubrication (in the form of shaving cream, gel, or soap) is important to prevent the hair from being forced underneath the surface of the skin. In addition, the application of too much force with a razor can contribute to hair that is cut shorter than the surrounding dermis. Using a beard trimmer at the lowest setting (1.0 or 0.5 mm) instead of shaving is an effective alternative.

Alternatively, ingrown hair can be prevented by removing the hair permanently, e.g. by laser hair removal or hair removal through electrolysis.

Not enough exfoliation before and after hair removal causes hair to become ingrown. Daily exfoliation prevents the accumulation of excess skin, which can allow hair to grow properly above the skin. Preventative tools include chemical exfoliation: coffee scrub, liquids, creams, or physical exfoliation: gloves, loofah, or an ingrown hair prevention brush with soft and firm bristles.

== Treatment ==
The many different treatments are available for ingrown hairs:

- They can be removed with tweezers (though this can be painful) or dislodged with a rotatable medical device for ingrown hairs.
- Some people who chronically get ingrown hairs use laser treatment or electrolysis to completely prevent hair growth.
- Different products prevent or cure ingrown hair. Some are alcohol-based, while others are alcohol-free. For some, alcohol can cause skin irritation, and thus alcohol-free products may be preferred.
- Prophylactic treatments include twice-daily topical application of diluted glycolic acid.
- Twice a day application of benzoyl peroxide for several days or weeks is effective in treating ingrown hairs.
- Applying salicylic acid solution is also a common remedy for ingrown hairs caused by waxing or shaving.
- Use an exfoliating glove in the shower and exfoliate the area every day.

Other treatments include putting a warm washcloth over the ingrown hair, shaving in a different direction, exfoliating with facial scrubs, brushes, sponges, towels, salves, or creams containing acids, and ibuprofen or other nonsteroidal anti-inflammatory drugs.

== See also ==
- Hair splinter
- Pilonidal disease
