= Papulopustular =

Type of skin condition

A papulopustular condition is a condition composed of both papule and pustules.

Examples of papulopustular conditions include:

- Papulopustular rosacea
- Papulopustular acne
- Sycosis
