= Favus =

- Other names: Tinea favosa
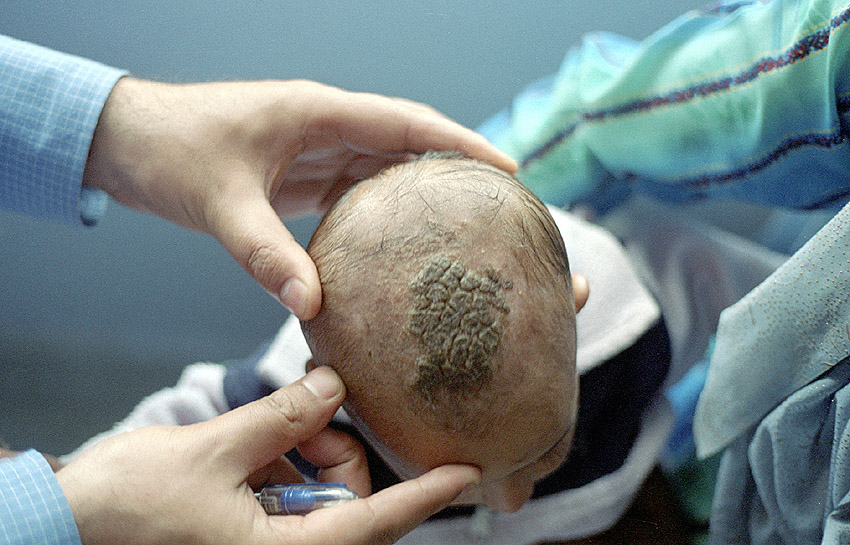
- An infant with favus, in Kharah, Akhnoor District, Jammu & Kashmir, India.
- Specialty: Infectious diseases

Favus (Latin for "honeycomb") or tinea favosa is the severe form of tinea capitis, a skin infectious disease caused by the dermatophyte fungus Trichophyton schoenleinii. Typically the species affects the scalp, but occasionally occurs as onychomycosis, tinea barbae, or tinea corporis.

The word favid is more used than French word favus, which is close to the Latin etymology.

== Presentation ==
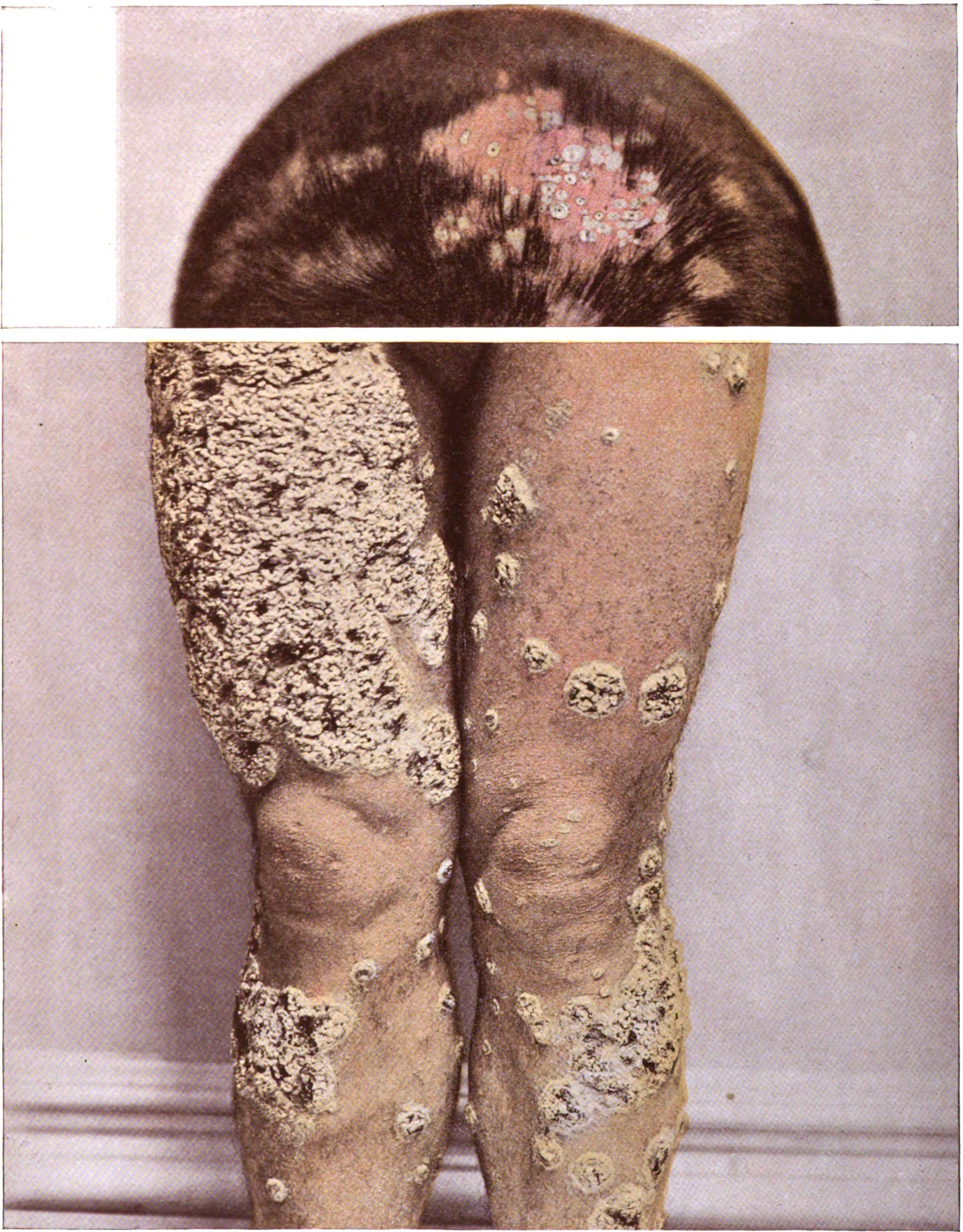
Favus on the head and legs

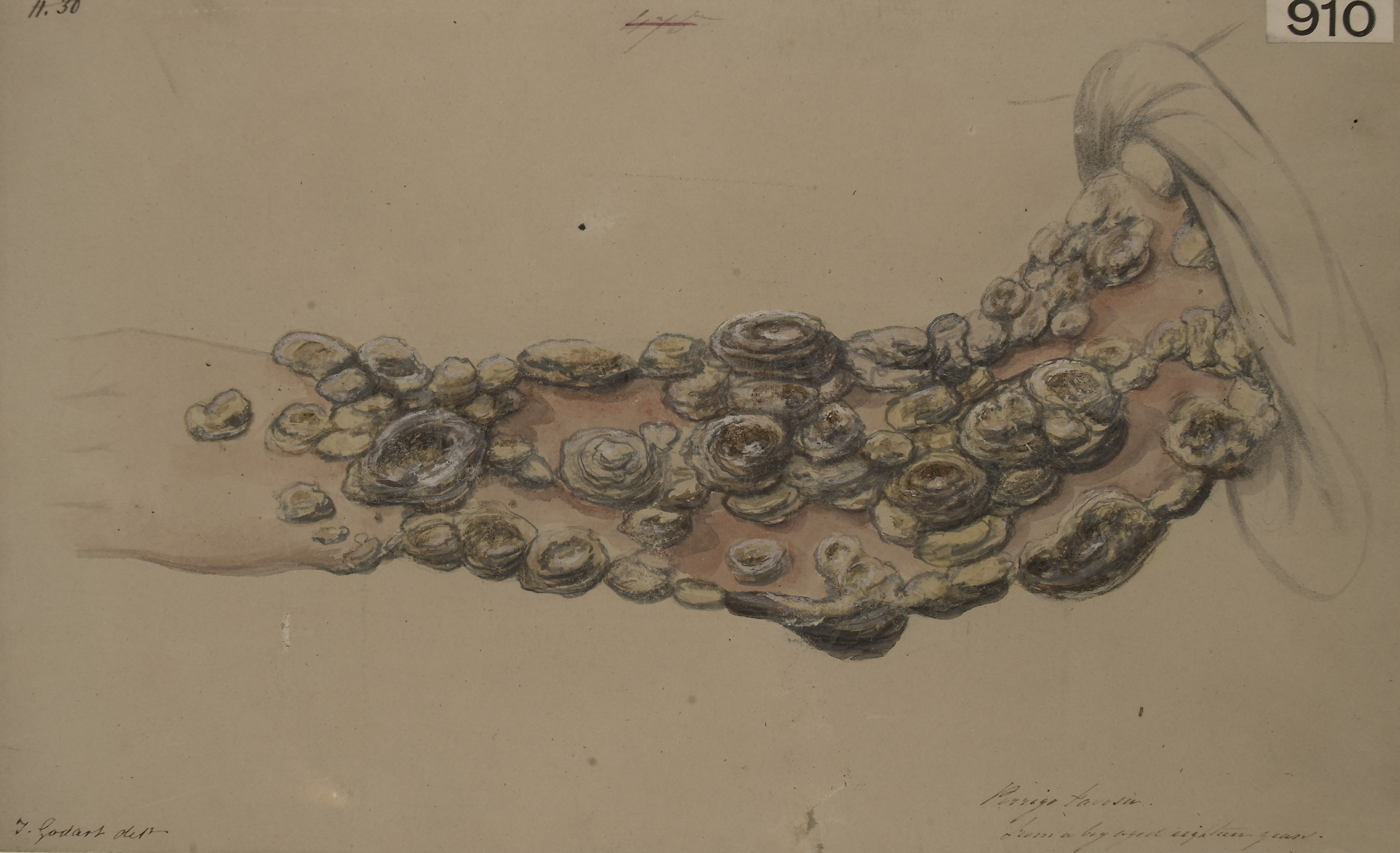
Favus on the arm

The uncomplicated appearance is that of a number of yellowish, circular, cup-shaped crusts (scutulum or shield) grouped in patches like a honeycomb, each crust about the size of a split pea, with a bundle of hair projecting in the center. These increase in size and become crusted over, so that the characteristic lesion can only be seen round the edge of the scab. A mousy odour is often present. Growth continues to take place for several months, when scab and scutulum go away, leaving a shining bare patch destitute of hair. The disease is essentially chronic, lasting from ten to twenty years. It is caused by the growth of a fungus, and pathologically is the reaction of the tissues to the growth.

The fungus was named after a microscopic structure termed "achorion" (a term not used in modern science), seen in scrapings of infected skin, which consists of slender, mycelial threads matted together, bearing oval, nucleated fungal substrate-arthroconidia either free or jointed. This structure is currently called "scutula." The fungus itself is now called Trichophyton schoenleinii.

During initial infection, the fungal spores would appear to enter through the unbroken cutaneous surface, and to germinate mostly in and around the hair follicle and sometimes in the shaft of the hair.

== Species ==
Favus is the first human fungal disease in which a fungus was definitely identified (by J. L. Schönlein in 1839). The discovery was published in a brief note of twenty lines in Müllers Archiv for that year (p. 82). In 1841, the Hungary-born French physician David Gruby independently described the fungus-associated favus. The fungus was subsequently named by Robert Remak as Achorion schoenleinii in honor of its discoverer.

In 1892, two additional "species" of the fungus were described by Paul Gerson Unna: the Favus griseus, giving rise to greyish-yellow scutula; and the Favus sulphureus celerior, causing sulfur-yellow scutula of a rapid growth. This was in the days before scientists learned to rigorously distinguish microorganism-identities from disease-identities, and these antique, ambiguous disease-based names no longer have status either in mycology or in dermatology today.

Similar looking infections, sometimes diagnosed as favid but more often as atypical inflammatory tinea, may be caused by more common dermatophyte infections, in particular Microsporum gypseum, the most common soil-borne dermatophyte, and Trichophyton quinckeanum. The latter was previously called Trichophyton mentagrophytes var. quinckeanum, the agent of mouse favus infection.

== Treatment ==
Up until the advent of modern therapies, favus was widespread worldwide; prior to Schönlein's recognition of it as a fungal disease, it was frequently confused with Hansen's disease, better known as leprosy, and affected Europeans were sometimes committed to leprosaria. Today, due to this species' high susceptibility to the antifungal drug griseofulvin, it has been eliminated from most parts of the world except rural central Asia and scattered rural areas of Africa. It is mainly a disease connected to demographic poverty and isolation, but is so readily treatable that it is among the diseases most likely to be eliminated by modern medicine.
