= Scutulum =

A scutulum is a yellow, perifollicular, saucerlike or cup-shaped crust with a cheesy odor, composed of dense mats of mycelia and epithelial debris. Scutula often occur on the scalp and are characteristic of favus.

== Morphology ==
- Consists of a crust-like yellow lesion (sulphur cap)
- Has a concave-convex surface with its convexity to the scalp making for itself an erosion or depression of epidermis, so it is firmly adherent to the scalp
- Upon detachment it gives a serosangiunous discharge (serum and blood)
- size : from a few millimetres to a few centimetres
