= Pseudofolliculitis barbae =

- Other names: Barber's itch, folliculitis barbae traumatica, razor bumps, scarring pseudofolliculitis of the beard, shave bumps
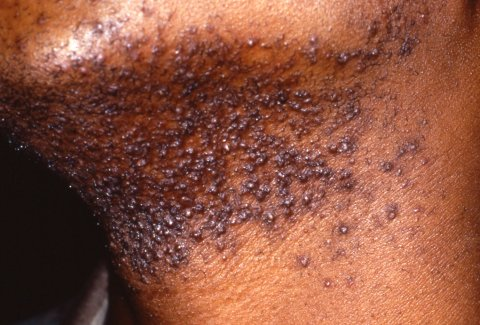
- A particularly severe case of Pseudofolliculitis barbae
- Pronunciation: /ˌsjuːdoʊfəˌlɪkjʊˈlaɪtɪs ˈbɑːrbiː/
- Specialty: Dermatology

Pseudofolliculitis barbae (PFB) is a type of irritant folliculitis that commonly affects people who have curly or thick facial hair. It occurs when hair curls back into the skin after shaving, causing inflammation, redness, and bumps. This can lead to ingrown hairs, scarring, itchiness, and skin discoloration. PFB can be treated with various methods, including changing shaving habits, using topical creams or ointments, and undergoing chemical-, or laser hair removal. Prevention measures include making changes to one's shaving technique: using sharp razors, avoiding too close a shave, using an astringent — such as alum — and an antiseptic — such as alcohol-based aftershave after shaving.

It was first described in 1956.

== Signs and symptoms ==
=== Related conditions ===
Razor burn is a lesser condition caused by shaving, characterized by mild to moderate redness and irritation on the surface of the skin. Unlike PFB, it is usually transient, and there is no infection involved.

There is also a condition called folliculitis barbae. The difference between the two is the cause of the inflammation in the hair follicles. Where folliculitis barbae is caused by viral or bacterial infections, pseudofolliculitis is created by irritation from shaving and ingrown hairs.

Pseudofolliculitis nuchae, a related condition, occurs on the back of the neck, often along the posterior hairline when curved hairs are cut short and allowed to grow back into the skin. Left untreated, this can develop into acne keloidalis nuchae, a condition in which hard, dark keloid-like bumps form on the neck. Both occur frequently in black men in the military. It is so common in the U.S. military that the services have protocols for its management.

== Cause ==
Pseudofolliculitis barbae (PFB) is most common on the face, but it can also happen on other parts of the body where hair is shaved or plucked, especially areas where hair is curly and the skin is sensitive, such as genital shaving (more properly termed pseudofolliculitis pubis or PFP).

After a hair has been shaved, it begins to grow back. Curly hair tends to curl into the skin instead of straight out of the follicle, leading to an inflammation reaction. PFB can make the skin look itchy and red, and in some cases, it can even look like pimples. These inflamed papules or pustules can form, especially if the area becomes infected.

This is especially a problem for some men who have naturally coarse or tightly curling thick hair. Curly hair increases the likelihood of PFB by a factor of 50. If left untreated over time, this can cause keloid scarring in the beard area.

Pseudofolliculitis barbae can further be divided into two types of ingrown hairs: transfollicular and extrafollicular. The extrafollicular hair is a hair that has exited the follicle and reentered the skin. The transfollicular hair never exits the follicle, but because of its naturally curly nature curls back into the follicle, causing fluid build-up and irritation.

A common polymorphism in a keratin gene (K6hf) has been linked to PFB, suggesting that it may be a genetic risk factor. This sequence change leads to an amino acid substitution in the highly conserved alpha helix initiation motif of the K6hf rod domain. Carriers of the A12T polymorphism are six times more likely to develop PFB compared with people homozygous for the wild-type K6hf sequence. This suggests K6hf mutation structurally weakens the companion layer separating the inner and outer root sheath and increases the chances that a beard hair will in-grow.

== Prevention ==
The most efficient prevention is to grow a beard. For men who are required to, or simply prefer to shave, studies show the optimal length to be about 0.5 mm to 1 mm to prevent the hair growing back into the skin. Using a beard trimmer at the lowest setting (0.5mm or 1mm) instead of shaving is an efficient alternative. The resulting faint stubble can be shaped using a standard electric razor on non-problematic areas (cheeks, lower neck).

Some men use electric razors to prevent PFB. Those who use a razor should use a single blade or special wire-wrapped blade to avoid shaving too closely, with a new blade each shave. Shaving in the direction of hair growth every other day, rather than daily, may improve pseudofolliculitis barbae. If a blade must be used, softening the beard first with a hot, wet washcloth for five minutes or shaving while showering in hot water can be helpful. Some use shaving powders (a kind of chemical depilatory) to avoid the irritation of using a blade. Barium sulfide-based depilatories are most efficient, but produce an unpleasant smell.

== Treatment ==
The simplest treatment for PFB is to let the beard grow. Complete removal of the hair from its follicle (epilation) is not recommended. Severe or transfollicular hairs may require removal by a dermatologist.

For most cases, completely avoiding shaving for three to four weeks allows all lesions to subside, and most extrafollicular hairs will resolve themselves within at least ten days.

Medications may also be prescribed to speed the healing of the skin. Clinical trials have shown glycolic acid–based peels to be an effective and well-tolerated therapy, which resulted in significantly fewer PFB lesions on the face and neck. The mechanism of action of glycolic acid is unknown, but it is hypothesized that straighter hair growth is caused by the reduction of sulfhydrylbonds in the hair shaft by glycolic acid, which results in reduced re-entry of the hair shaft into the follicular wall or epidermis. Salicylic acid peels are also effective. Prescription antibiotic gels (Benzamycin, Cleocin-T) or oral antibiotics are also used. Benzoyl peroxide may be used topically, combined, or not with prescription antibiotics. Tretinoin is a potent treatment that helps even out any scarring after a few months. It is added as a nightly application of tretinoin cream 0.05–0.1% to the beard skin while the beard is growing out. Tea tree oil, witch hazel, and hydrocortisone are also noted as possible treatments and remedies for razor bumps.

=== Long-term therapies ===
Permanent removal of the hair follicle is the only definitive treatment for PFB. Electrolysis is effective but limited by its slow pace, pain, and expense. Laser-assisted hair removal has proven effective and can last for years. Laser therapies utilize melanin-selective photothermolysis to heat up hair shafts and damage follicular stem cells, which over time impairs hair growth. Common laser systems used to treat PFC are pulsed alexandrite (755 nm), diode (800–810 nm) and Nd:YAG (1064 nm) lasers. Nd: YAG lasers are indicated for darker-pigmented individuals. Laser therapy for PFC typically requires at least six treatments spaced 4–6 weeks apart. Side effects include erythema and skin discoloration.

=== US Navy restriction ===
In July 2026, it was reported that Defense Secretary Pete Hegseth was implementing a military policy that would potentially ban people suffering from Pseudofolliculitis barbae from serving in the US Navy.

== See also ==
- Laser hair removal
- List of cutaneous conditions
- Facial hair in the military#United States
