= Splinter =

Sharp object in skin

- Other names: Sliver
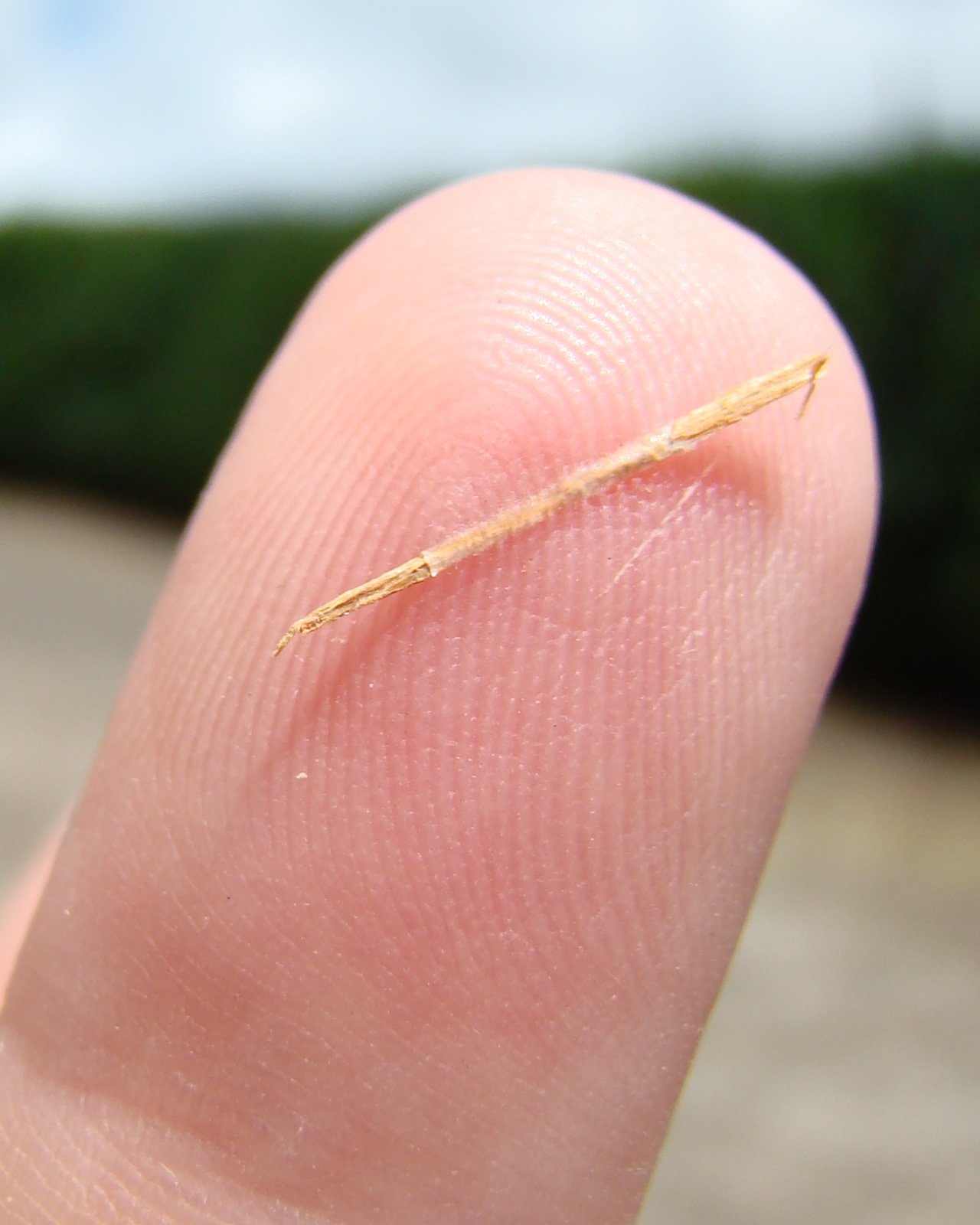
- Wooden splinter in a finger
- Specialty: Family medicine, emergency medicine
- Complications: Infection
- Types: Wood, hair, glass, plastic, metal, and spines of animals
- Diagnostic method: Physical examination

A splinter (also known as a sliver) is a fragment of a larger object, or a foreign body that becomes embedded in a body. To be considered a splinter, the foreign body must penetrate and remain lodged within the tissue. Splinters may cause initial pain due to the damage of flesh and muscle, and can cause an infection through contamination by bacteria on the foreign object.

Splinters are commonly made of wood, but they may be constituted of several other materials, such as hair, glass, plastic, metal, and the spines of animals.

As with any wound that breaks the skin, splinters can lead to infection, which, if left untreated, could develop into more serious complications. Medical advice should be sought if a splinter remains inside the body for more than 2 or 3 days, or if the affected area shows signs of inflammation or tenderness regardless of whether the splinter has been removed.

== Mechanism ==
A splinter initially causes pain at point of entry as the sharp object perforates the cutaneous layer of the skin, and settles in the subcutaneous layer of the skin. In some cases, the splinter can penetrate underlying tissue, breaking the subcutaneous layer and implanting itself in muscle tissue or, more rarely, bone. Whilst some splinters remain in place, others, including hair splinters, may continue to migrate through the body, which can potentially result in further irritation and tissue damage.

== Classification ==
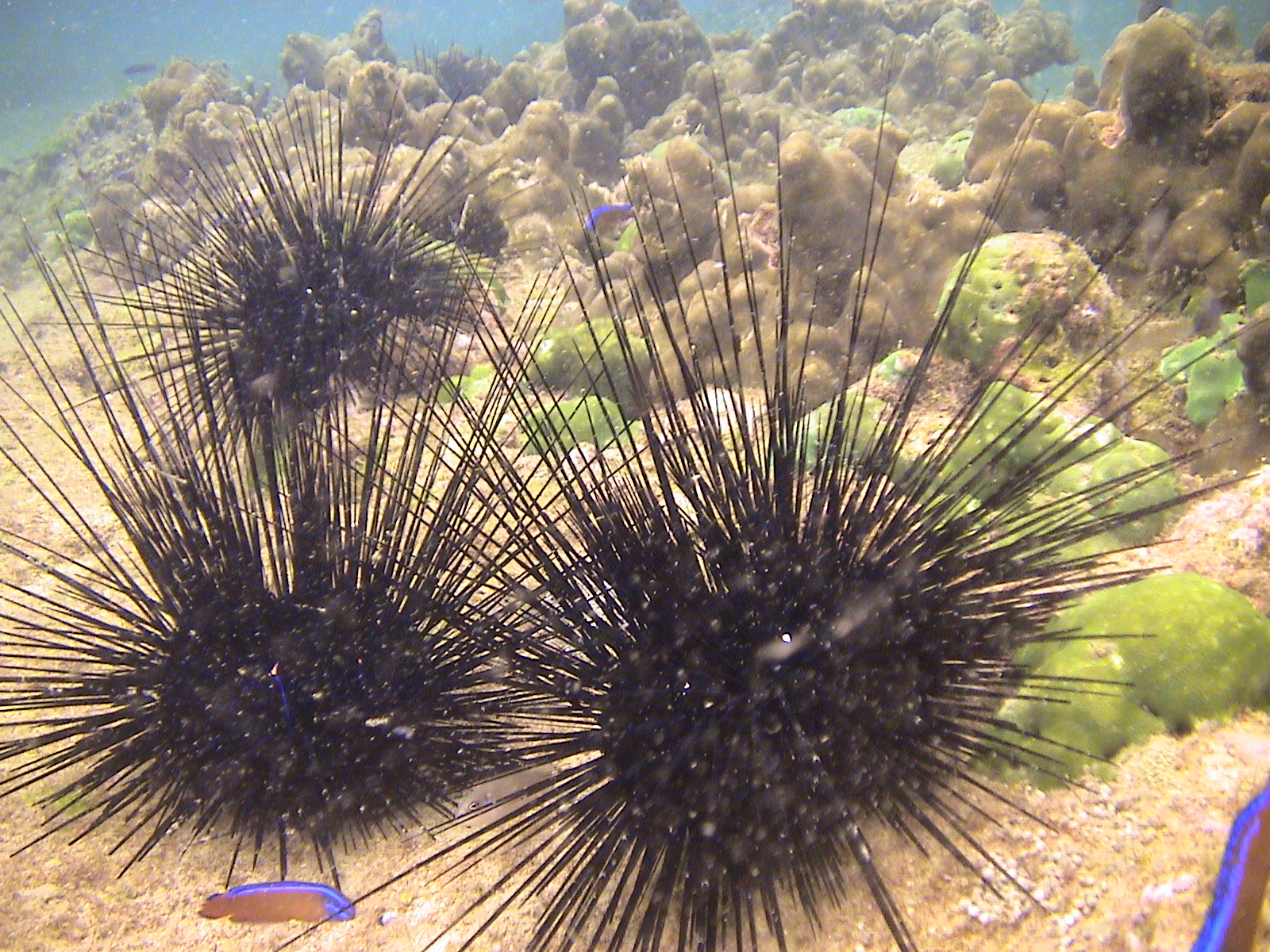
Sea urchins may cause splinters

According to the American Academy of Family Physicians, the most common foreign bodies contracted by people fall into two official classes: biological splinters, and nonbiological splinters. Splinters in the biological class are composed of organic material such as bone, fish spines, teeth, hair and wood. In the nonbiological class, common splinters contracted are typically made of glass, metal, aluminum, fishhooks, pencil graphite, and plastic.

Rarely, people may become infected with splinters from more unusual sources. Common cases of exotic foreign bodies include sea urchins, insect stings, stingray spines, and even grenade shrapnel.

== Materials ==
=== Wood ===
Wood splinters are contracted from lumber or other plant-based materials and require removal because they are associated with inflammation and an increased risk of infection. Larger or more deeply set wood splinters can result in difficult removal or localization of the foreign body within body tissue.

=== Fishhooks ===
Fishhooks that become lodged in the skin are problematic due to the barbs found on the ends of most fishhooks. These barbs are designed by function to make removal difficult, and thus improper removal can result in additional tissue damage, including tearing of skin and muscle. Fishhook injuries most frequently affect the hands, face, scalp, feet, and eyes.

=== Glass ===
Glass splinters may produce more acute sensations in the skin than other types of foreign objects. Although glass is generally radiopaque and detectable by radiography, there is limited ability for radiography to detect glass fragments smaller than 2 mm. Most glass splinters are inert, and generally lack the ability to migrate to other regions of the body.

=== Metal ===
Graphite and pencil lead fragments, once lodged in the cutaneous layer of the skin, can cause permanent pigmentation or "tattooing" if not immediately removed. Metallic foreign bodies range from small projectiles, such as BB pellets, to larger fragments like grenade shrapnel. Superficial metallic objects can often be removed without difficulty; however, if the puncture protrudes past the subcutaneous layers of the skin, or is located near vital organs or muscle, it may be safer to leave it in place and seek immediate medical evaluation.

=== Hair ===
Typically, hair splinters (cutaneous pili migrans) are short lengths of hair, especially stiff hair such as trimmed beard hair or pet hair, can insert themselves under the skin of the feet or hands. They are commonly experienced by hairdressers and dog groomers. Hair splinters are distinct from ingrown hairs, where a hair still attached to its follicle grows back under (or fails to emerge from) the skin. Hair splinters can also often be exogenous and may have belonged to another person or animal.

== Detection ==
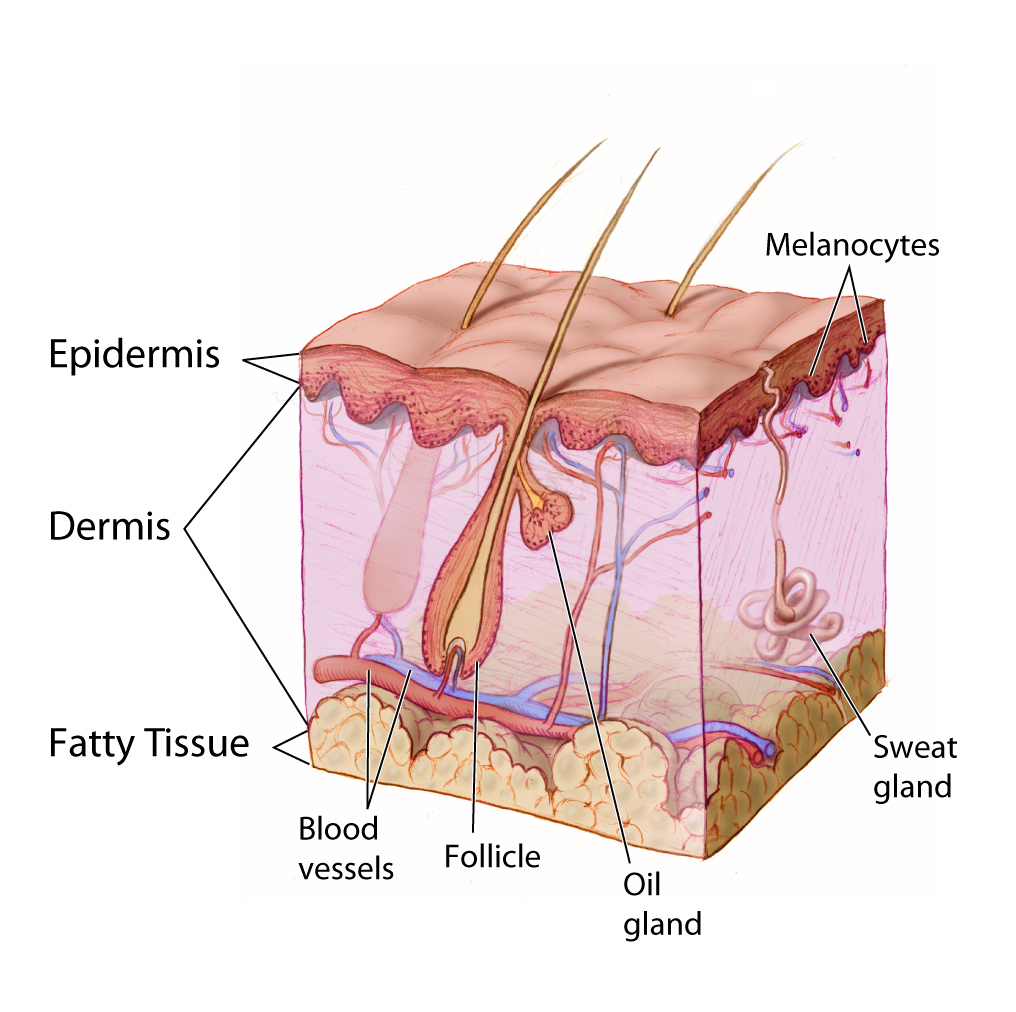
Anatomical diagram of the skin

Splinters are often first detected by the person with the splinter in their body. There are many signs that a splinter has entered one's body.

=== Indicators of a hidden foreign body ===
- Puncture wound
- Blood-stained injury track of a fresh wound
- Sharp pain with deep palpation over a puncture wound
- Discoloration beneath the epidermis
- Wound that elicits pain with movement
- Wound that fails to heal
- Abscess (with sterile culture)
- Pain associated with a mass
- Mass under the epidermis
- Chronically draining purulent wound
- Cyst
- Granuloma formation
- Sterile monoarticular arthritis
- Periosteal reactions
- Osteomyelitis
- Pseudotumors of bone
- Delayed tendon or nerve injury

=== Imaging ===
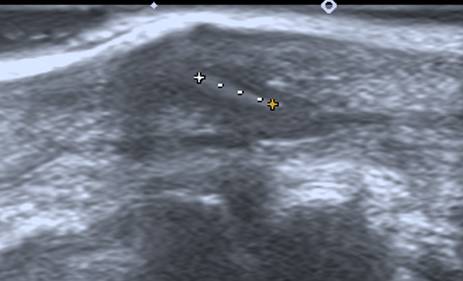
Ultrasonography of a subcutaneous splinter (in a finger) 4 x 1mm with oblique stroke.

If manual detection and localization fail, the main methods for medical imaging of splinters are:

- Projectional radiography — used to locate bone, fish spines, glass, gravel-stone, metal, aluminum, pencil graphite, some plastics, teeth, and some wood (e.g., spines, cactus, thorns)
- Medical ultrasonography — used to locate glass, metal, pencil graphite, some plastics, stone, and some types of wood.

Small wooden splinters (1–4 mm) distant from bones are most easily detected by ultrasonography, while CT scan and magnetic resonance imaging have higher sensitivity for those near bones.

== Removal ==
There are several medical techniques used to remove splinters safely. Common medical techniques include the elliptical excision technique and the string technique. In the elliptical excision technique, the surrounding area of the splinter is cut in an elliptical shape. The flesh in the elliptical area is then excised (in the shape of an inverted cone) and the whole piece of tissue containing the splinter is removed. The elliptical excision technique is often used to remove splinter in the case it is difficult to remove.

The string technique is limited to fishhook removal. A string is looped around the base of the hook, and as the hook is pressed further into the skin, the downward pressure applied unhooks the barb from the tissue. The string is then pulled, the hook to be withdrawn along the path of entry out of the body without snagging any additional flesh.

Because the splinter penetrates the body's protective barrier and therefore facilitates bacterial contamination, it could potentially allow for an individual to contract an infection.

== Infection ==
Infection is usually determined by the duration of time that the foreign object remains lodged in the human body. Objects that have included poison, deep penetration, dirt, or bite injuries generally result in a shorter time until infection becomes noticeable. According to the American Academy of Family Physicians (AAFP), patients who are older, or have diabetes, or have a splinter wound that is longer, wider, more jagged or deeper, have a much higher risk of infection. The simplest method to avoid infection is to completely remove the splinters or foreign body as soon as possible. Though infection is generally the largest complication encountered with splinters, ranging from 1.1 to 12 percent presence, the use of antibiotics in non-bite cases is generally deemed unnecessary by the medical community. Though cases are rare, infection of foreign body wounds can result in cases of tetanus.

One case of tetanus contraction through a splinter was seen in Ohio in 1993. An 80-year-old woman was presented to an ED with dysphagia and a stiff jaw. Not long after a preliminary checkup, a wood splinter was found to have been lodged in her chin for approximately 1 week; the area was erythematous with active purulent drainage. The woman was diagnosed with tetanus, admitted to the hospital, and begun on a regimen of 3,000 units of tetanus immune globulin, tetanus toxoid, and intravenous clindamycin. Despite aggressive treatment, including assisted mechanical ventilation, the patient died 15 days later from the effects of her primary infection. The woman had no history of previous tetanus vaccinations despite previous care for a wound and ongoing medical attention for hypertension.

Since most splinters are made of organic matter, they are much more dangerous than other types of things puncturing the body. Splinters are usually infected with many bacteria which then turn into an infection such as tetanus. Due to a splinter being made of organic matter, it makes it much more difficult for the body to get rid of it.
