= Homilies on Leviticus =

Homilies delivered by Origen in Alexandria

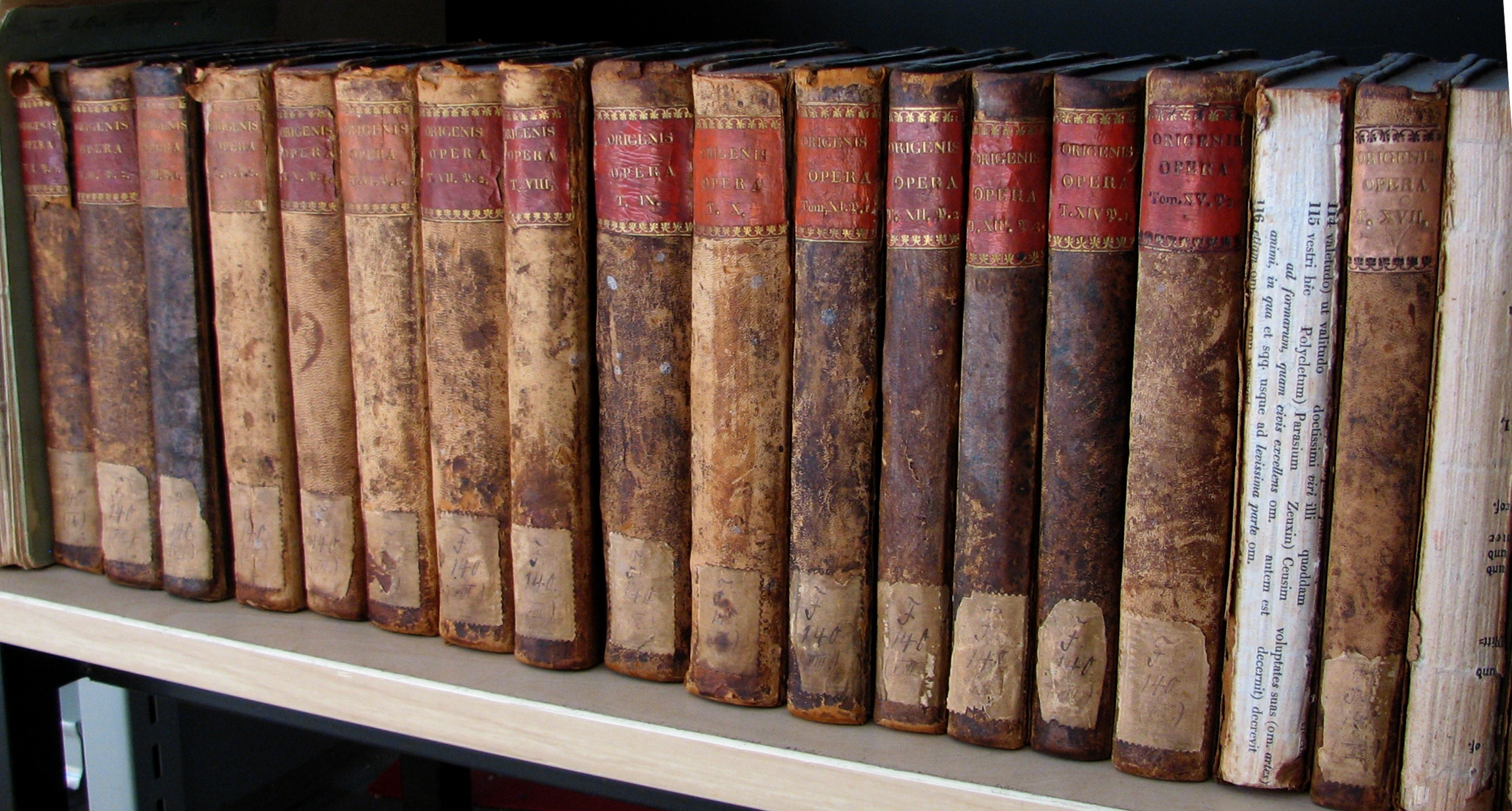
Shelf of the works of Origen in Latin translation.

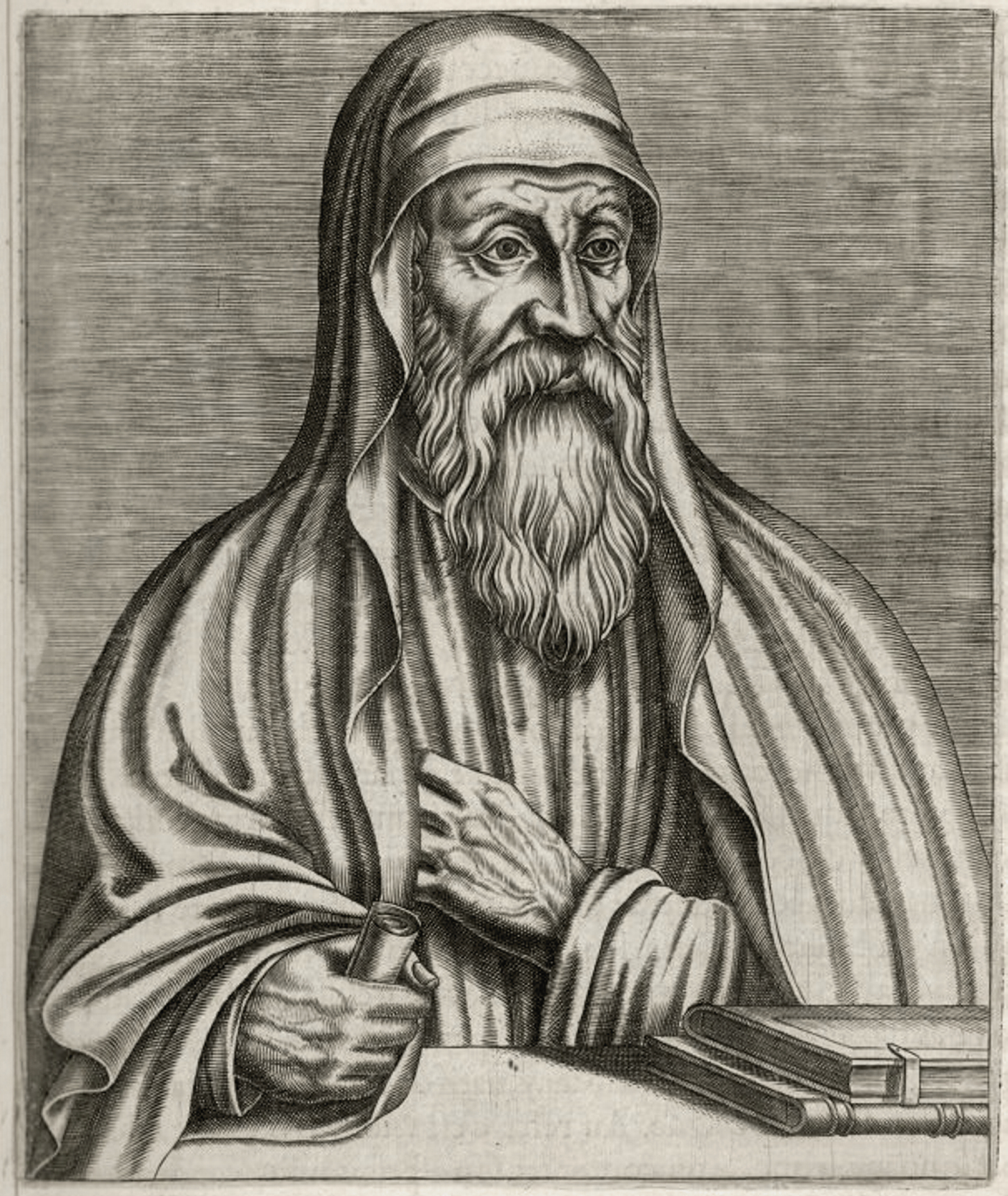
Imaginary portrait of Origen (Guillaume Chaudière, 1584)

Homilies on Leviticus are homilies that were delivered by Origen in Alexandria near the end of his life, over a course of three years between 238 and 244. They were translated into Latin by Rufinus.

== Background ==
Sometime during the 3rd century AD, after the perscutions by Maximinus Daia, Theoctistus gave Origen the responsibility to deliver homilies during the three year liturgical cycle of the Church in which the Old Testament and Gospel would be fully covered. There were non-eucharistic meetings attended by catechumens as well as full members of the Church. Eucharistic meetings were for full members only, where the Gospels were read and homilies delivered on Gospel text. On some days fasts were observed(Cf. Hom-Lev 10.2):

Whence also we must say something now to those who think that in virtue of the commandment of the Law they must also practice the fast of the Jews. First of all, I will use the words of Paul which say that if anyone wants to preserve one thing from the observances of the Law, he is 'subject to doing the whole law.' Therefore, let whoever observes these fasts go up 'three times a year' to Jerusalem 'to appear before the Temple of the Lord' and offer himself to the priest. Let him seek the altar which was turned into dust; let him offer sacrifices with no high priest standing by.

The fasts were spiritual fasts requiring the abstinence from sin, luxuries, evil words and deeds, perverse doctrines, deceptive philosophies and such.

== Notes on translation ==
Rufinus admitted that he made more changes to the Homilies on Leviticus than Origen's homilies on the other books of the Pentateuch. He wrote in the translator's preface that the "duty of supplying what was wanted I took up because I thought that the practice of agitating questions and then leaving them unsolved, which he frequently adopts in his homiletic mode of speaking, might prove distasteful to the Latin reader."

Rufinus was especially concerned with Origen's teachings on the Trinity and he may have made some alterations to temper Origen's views on this subject. In Homily 12.3 the discussion centers on the act of anointing that makes Christ, and that Jesus therefore becomes Christ as 'the Father is [always] in the Son as the son is [always] in the Father"—this would appear to reflect 4th century orthodox views more than Origen's.

== Content ==
Origen argued against literal interpretations that would require Christians "to sacrifice calves and lambs and to offer fine wheat flour with incense and oil" and called those who insisted on literal readings "wicked presbyters". Origen believed there were levels of spiritual meaning in the bible text that not everyone is able to understand. According to Origen, the ability of a person to interpret the text was guided by the maturity of their religious insight: "These things are less clear to us the same degree as our conversion to the Lord is less complete" He said those who were limited to literal interpretations "hold false opinions and make impious or ignorant assertions about God". In Homilies on Leviticus, Origen cites Scripture to justify spiritual interpretations. In his view, the first sanctuary of the Tent of Witness represents the Church and the second is the heavenly sanctuary where Christ continues to occupy the position of High Priest. In Homilies on Leviticus Origen expounds on the qualities of priests: to be perfect in everything, strict, wise and to examine themselves individually, forgive sins, and convert sinners (by words and by doctrine).
