= Achorion =

Obsolete genus of fungi

Achorion is an obsolete genus of dermatophyte fungus.

The species previously belonging to genus Achorion have been moved to other genera. Some notable species include:

- A. quinckeanum — now named Trichophyton quinckeanum, the species which causes favus in mice.
- A. schoenleinii — now named Trichophyton schoenleinii, or "Schönlein's tricophyton", the species which causes favus in humans.
- Other pathogenic fungi occasionally found in humans:
  - A. arloingi, now called Aleurisma arloingi
  - A. gypseum, now called Microsporum gypseum

== Sources ==
- American Illustrated Medical Dictionary (Philadelphia and London, 1938)
