= Gram-negative folliculitis =

- Specialty: Dermatology

Gram-negative folliculitis occurs in patients who have had moderately inflammatory acne for long periods and have been treated with long-term antibiotics, mainly tetracyclines, a disease in which cultures of lesions usually reveals a species of Klebsiella, Escherichia coli, Enterobacter, or, from the deep cystic lesions, Proteus.
