= Acne keloidalis nuchae =

- Other names: acne keloidalis, dermatitis papillaris capillitii, folliculitis keloidalis, folliculitis keloidis nuchae, nuchal keloid acne
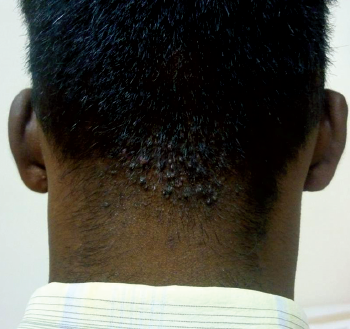
- An example of acne keloidalis nuchae.
- Pronunciation: (/ˈækni kiː.lɔɪˈdæ.lɪs ˈnu.kaɪ/)
- Specialty: Dermatology

Acne keloidalis nuchae (AKN), is a destructive scarring folliculitis that occurs most commonly on the occipital scalp of people of African descent, primarily men.

AKN is characterized by firm pink, flesh-colored or hyperpigmented bumps in the skin, which are usually located on the back of the head or neck. Acne keloidalis nuchae most commonly presents itself in individuals aged 13 to 25. The disease is closely related to pseudofolliculitis barbae and both occur frequently in black men in the military, where it is so common that the US Army has developed official protocols for management. Prolonged cases of AKN can cause keloid formation due to chronic irritation. Bacterial folliculitis and acne can mimic the appearance of AKN; however, unlike acne, comedones are not seen with AKN.

Treatments for AKN aim to reduce inflammation and prevent infections and scarring. Therapies for AKN may include topical antibiotics, topical or intralesional corticosteroids, and laser hair removal. Recommended modifications to shaving habits include liberal use of shaving cream, avoidance of stretching the skin while shaving, and use of a single-blade razor rather than a razor with multiple blades.

== See also ==
- List of cutaneous conditions
