= Tinea barbae =

- Other names: Barber's itch, ringworm of the beard, Tinea sycosis
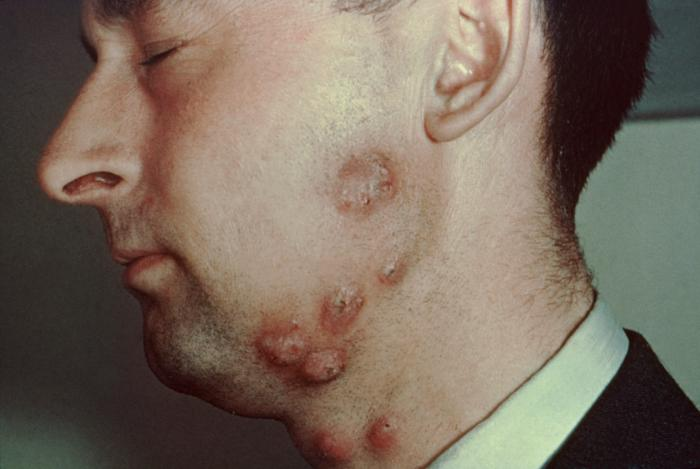
- Tinea barbae or "barber's itch"
- Specialty: Infectious disease

Tinea barbae is a fungal infection of the hair. Tinea barbae is due to a dermatophytic infection around the bearded area of men. Generally, the infection occurs as a follicular inflammation, or as a cutaneous granulomatous lesion, i.e. a chronic inflammatory reaction. It is one of the causes of folliculitis. It is most common among agricultural workers, as the transmission is more common from animal-to-human than human-to-human. The most common causes are Trichophyton mentagrophytes and T. verrucosum.

== Signs and symptoms ==
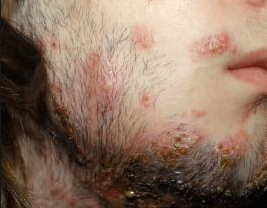
Man displaying symptoms

Main symptoms that occur when affected with tinea barbae is pimple or blister amongst affected area, swelling and redness around infected area, red and lumpy skin on infected area. Crusting around hairs in infected area will occur, hairs on infected area will also be effortless to pull out. Tinea barbae can be itchy or painful to touch but these symptoms do not always occur.

== Transmission ==
The transmission of tinea barbae to humans occurs through contact of an infected animal to the skin of a human. Infection can occasionally be transmitted through contact of infected animal hair on human skin. Tinea barbae is very rarely transmitted through human to human contact but is not completely impossible.

== Diagnosis ==
Diagnosis of tinea barbae will firstly include questions being asked from doctors about interactions with farm animals and lifestyle experiences. Doctor will then gain knowledge on possible disease by microscopy, this is viewing the skin under a microscope to get an enlarge view of infected area. Skin scraping and removal of hairs on infected area will occur for medical examination. To acquire causation of tinea barbae putting infected area under ultraviolet light can achieve this, as infection caused by animal and human contact will not show up as fluorescent under the ultraviolet light, compared to other causes of this disease.

== Treatment ==
Treatment can vary with severity of the infection. Moderate cases of tinea barbae can be treated with topical antifungal medications. Topical antifungal medications will come in the form of cream, which can normally be obtained over the counter. More serious cases of tinea barbae warrant an oral antifungal medication.
