= Sycosis vulgaris =

- Other names: Barber's itch, Sycosis barbae
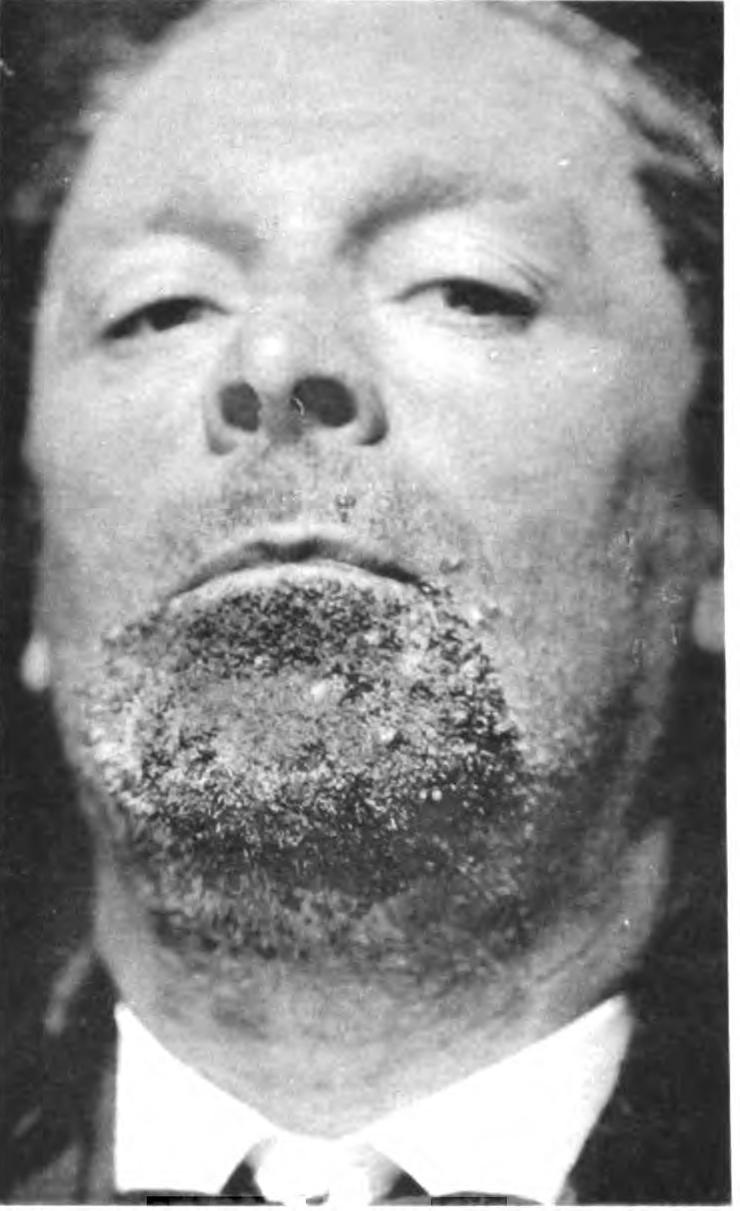
- Sycosis vulgaris
- Specialty: Dermatology

Sycosis vulgaris is a cutaneous condition characterized by a chronic infection of the chin or bearded region.

The irritation is caused by a deep infection of hair follicles, often by species of Staphylococcus or Propionibacterium bacteria. It usually affects men who shave as this results in bacterial inoculation all over the face. Asymptomatic or painful and tender erythematous papules and pustules may form around coarse hair in the beard (sycosis barbae) or the back of the neck (sycosis nuchae). In more severe cases, there may be crusting, follicular destruction and scarring.

== See also ==
- Folliculitis
- List of cutaneous conditions
