= Scytalidium ganodermophthorum =

Scientific classification
- Domain: Eukaryota
- Kingdom: Fungi
- Division: Ascomycota
- Class: Leotiomycetes
- Order: Helotiales
- Genus: Scytalidium
- Species: S. ganodermophthorum

Binomial name
- Scytalidium ganodermophthorum Kang, Sigler, Y.W. Lee & S.H. Yun

Synonyms
- Xylogone ganodermophthora

Species of fungi

Scytalidium ganodermophthorum is an anthroconidial ascomycete fungus in the Scytalidium genus. It is also known by its teleomorph name Xylogone ganodermophthora. It is the cause of yellow rot in lingzhi mushrooms and it is used in spalting as a pigmenting fungi.

== Taxonomy ==
Scytalidium ganodermophthorum was first identified in Korea as yellow rot, a disease affecting Ganoderma lucidum. In 1996, Jong-Kyu Lee et al. identified it as a fungal pathogen and categorized it as Xylogone sphaerospora. However, in 1998, Se-Jong Oh and researchers at Kangwon National University recategorized the fungus as Arthrographis cuboidea based on morphological characteristics. Researchers returned to the topic in 2010 and reclassified the fungus as Xylogone ganodermophthora. It is most frequently referred to by its anamorph name, S. ganodermophthorum. DNA analysis suggests that S. ganodermophthorum is part of a clade that includes X. sphaerospora, A. cuboidea and Scytalidium lignicola within Scytalidium, but the position of the clade within Leotiomycetes is unknown.

== Description ==
The fungus is a saprobe and opportunistic fungal pathogen found in wood and soil. Infected wood exhibits a greenish-yellow color with brown border lines. Eventually, infected wood turns black and disintegrates as S. ganodermophthorum consumes it. Fungal colonies range from pale yellow to yellow green on agar plates.

This species reproduces sexually and asexually. In sexual reproduction, it produces small yellow fruiting bodies known as ascocarps. These ascomata are 45-95 μm spheres with dark, thick walls. Within the ascomata are many asci; these asci are thin-walled and disintegrate easily. The ascospores contained in the asci are smooth, refractive spheres with a glassy appearance, about 3.6-4.3 μm in diameter. Most ascospores produced by the ascomata are not viable. In asexual reproduction, the fungus forms conidiophores through mitosis. Conidiophores are septate and break into cylindrical arthrospores 3-6 μm long and 3-4 μm wide. Both sexual and asexual spores are disseminated through soil and wood.

== Pathogenicity ==
Yellow rot first emerged in Korean lingzhi cultivation beds the late 1980s. It rapidly spread through established growing facilities; Chulwon cultivation areas experienced a 61% incidence of the disease and Kanghwa areas experienced a 94% incidence rate. The Shintanjin growing site was also impacted, although the extent of infection was not reported. Newer growing sites in Moonkyung and Hongsung were not infected as of 1998. By 2003, 17 growing sites all over Korea had reported yellow rot. S. ganodermophthorum contamination causes severe yield and profit losses, is difficult to eliminate, and can prevent future use of cultivation spaces. So far, yellow rot has only been reported in Korean cultivation houses.

Diseased G. lucidum display the yellow-green color of S. ganodermophthorum at the base of the mushroom and pilei are malformed. The change in color is due to the accumulation of S. ganodermophthorum mycelia. S. ganodermophthorum mycelia destroys the lingzhi mushroom. Inoculation of S. ganodermophthorum and G. lucidum on agar plates results in the arrest of G. lucidum growth and eventual death. Non-volatile compounds secreted by the pathogen are inhibitory of the crop mushroom's growth by themselves.

== Uses ==
Research into S. ganodermophthorum beyond its status as a fungal pathogen began in the 2000s. The Applied Mycology Lab at Oregon State University is currently researching applications of S. ganodermophthorum for spalting. This species produces a water-insoluble yellow pigment. The structure and components of this pigment are still unidentified. Due to its properties as an insoluble pigment, this fungal pigment is being examined as a naturally-derived aniline dye replacement. There are several methods of pigmenting wood with this fungus. In the cut-wood inoculation method, at 12 weeks, the yellow pigment completely saturated the wood samples. According to the woodchip-agar/chemical solvent extraction method created by Robinson, dichloromethane is the best solvent for extracting this pigment. The fungus can also be grown in a liquid culture and extracted with dichloromethane. Beyond woodworking, this pigment is also being investigated for its potential as a fabric and paint dye. On fabric, this pigment shows greater colorfastness for both light and washing compared to contemporary commercial dyes. Mordanting increases the colorfastness of the yellow pigment under UV radiation. Natural oils (such as linseed oil) can be used as nontoxic alternative carriers compared with dichloromethane, but the pigment is not stable in such carriers.

== See also ==
- Spalting
- Scytalidium (genus)
- Mushroom dye
