= Scytalidium hyalinum =

Scientific classification
- Kingdom: Fungi
- Division: Ascomycota
- Class: Leotiomycetes
- Order: Helotiales
- Genus: Scytalidium
- Species: S. hyalinum

Binomial name
- Scytalidium hyalinum C.K. Campb. & J.L. Mulder

Species of fungus

Scytalidium hyalinum is an ascomycete fungus currently in the genus Scytalidium. It causes dermatomycosis and systemic infections in humans and it is widespread throughout the world.

== Taxonomy ==
Scytalidium hyalinum was first isolated in 1977 in England by C.K. Campbell. It was isolated from 8 immigrants from Jamaica, Nigeria, and Sierra Leone who had shown signs of tinea pedis and skin infections.

It is unclear whether S. hyalinum and Neoscytalidium dimidiatum are very closely related or if S. hyalinum is a same species mutation of N. dimidiatum. Comparisons of several N. dimidiatum and S. hyalinum strains have found that all S. hyalinum strains differed from the N. dimidiatum strains by a single A-G polymorphism at position 144 and by the absence of an IE intron group that is present in N. dimidatum, which suggests they are different species.

== Description ==
Colonies on malt agar grow rapidly at 27 °C (81 °F) and produce white fluffy superficial mycelia as well as immersed mycelia. Hyphae are up to 4 μm in width, pale or colorless, septate, and smooth. Stromata are absent. Conidiophores are unusually small (micronematous), can be branched or unbranched, pale or colorless, straight, smooth, and irregular. Conidia are arthrosporic, simple, cylindrical to ellipsoid or rounded, sometimes rough, catenulate, separating, hyaline or pale, with thin cell walls.

Colonies are visible after only a few days of growth on Sabouraud’s dextrose agar. Fungal growth is robust at 37 °C (99 °F), the temperature of the human body. Growth is poor above 40 °C (104 °F), but colonies can survive at 42 °C (108 °F) for two weeks.

Scytalidium hyalinum is able to hydrolyse gelatin, casein, tyrosine, olive oil, and urea.

== Ecology ==
It is most likely endemic to West Africa, the West Indies, and the Pacific. It is also present in the UK, Spain, Italy, Australia, and France via travel and immigration. Until 2007, when it was recovered from soil in Indian rat burrows in India, S. hyalinum had never been isolated from the environment.

== Pathogenicity ==
Infection resembles N. dimidiatum infections. Lesions are confined to hands, feet, and toenails. The fungus is found in the toewebs and nails. Nail changes involve thickening, yellow-brown discoloration, and subungual keratosis. It can cause distinctive thickening, lichenification, and discoloration of the knuckles and sides of fingers, but it is not consistent. More than half of patients reported itching at site of infection. Infections are usually chronic, which suggests that the immune response is ineffective or deficient.

Scytalidium hyalinum can present a mixed infection with N. dimidiatum. The infections of both S. hyalinum and N. dimidiatum are virtually clinically indistinguishable from the chronic, non-inflammatory dry type of Trichophyton rubrum infection.

Both S. hyalinum and N. dimidiatum are resistant to treatment by griseofulvin and susceptible to cycloheximide. It is sensitive to clotrimazole and miconazole in vitro. Cases have also been treated with oral itraconazole. An in vitro study suggested that voriconazole could be effective for refractory infections. S. hyalinum is more susceptible to voriconazole than N. dimidiatum, perhaps because of its lack of protective melanin.

Scytalidium hyalinum and N. dimidiatum share a very similar antigenic structure distinct from other pathogenic fungi. The two species also demonstrate cross-reactivity with each other’s antigens and anti-sera derived from patients. Cross-reactivity between N. dimidiatum and S. hyalinum exoantigens has been demonstrated in both immunodiffusion tests and fused rocket immunoelectrophoresis tests.

In 2018, the first case of ocular infection by S. hyalinum was documented in France. Infection causes pain, red, dry eyes as well as abscesses on the cornea. Prognosis for ocular infections is poor, however it may be that the fungus was only able to cause infection because of reduced immune response in the patient. Treatment with antibiotics and fortified eye drops can be successful. The only other recorded ocular infection by a Scytalidium is N. dimidiatum.
