= Parakeratosis pustulosa =

- Specialty: Dermatology

Parakeratosis pustulosa is a cutaneous condition that is exclusively seen in children, usually involving one finger, most commonly the thumb or index finger, with the affected nail showing subungual hyperkeratosis and onycholysis.

The cause of parakeratosis pustulosa is unknown; however, there have been several diseases linked to it, and it does not seem to be genetic.

Parakeratosis pustulosa is diagnosed based on clinical characteristics and the exclusion of other conditions.

== Signs and symptoms ==
Parakeratosis pustulosa is most commonly seen in children as an eczematoid eruption near the free margin of the nail that extends to the dorsal nail fold. Under the free margin of the nail, hyperkeratosis causes the nail plate to pull up and results in a deformity that resembles a gaping toecap separated from the sole at the seam. Pitting and sporadic cross-ridging of the nail plate are more common in fingernails than toenails.

== Causes ==
Its cause is yet unknown. It appears that parakeratosis pustulosa is not inherited if it is not absent in siblings or other family members. Psoriasis, onychomycosis, and chronic dry fissured eczematoid dermatitis have all been frequently linked to it.

== Diagnosis ==
The diagnosis of parakeratosis pustulosa is made based on clinical features and the exclusion of other disorders.

== Treatment ==
There is no suggested specific therapy. Topical emollients are still the advised course of treatment, even though topical corticosteroids have been utilized in the majority of reports. Topical tretinoin therapy might not be necessary for many people.

== Epidemiology ==
The exact prevalence of parakeratosis pustulosa is unknown. It is more common in girls and occurs only in children.

== See also ==
- Nail Anatomy
- List of cutaneous conditions
