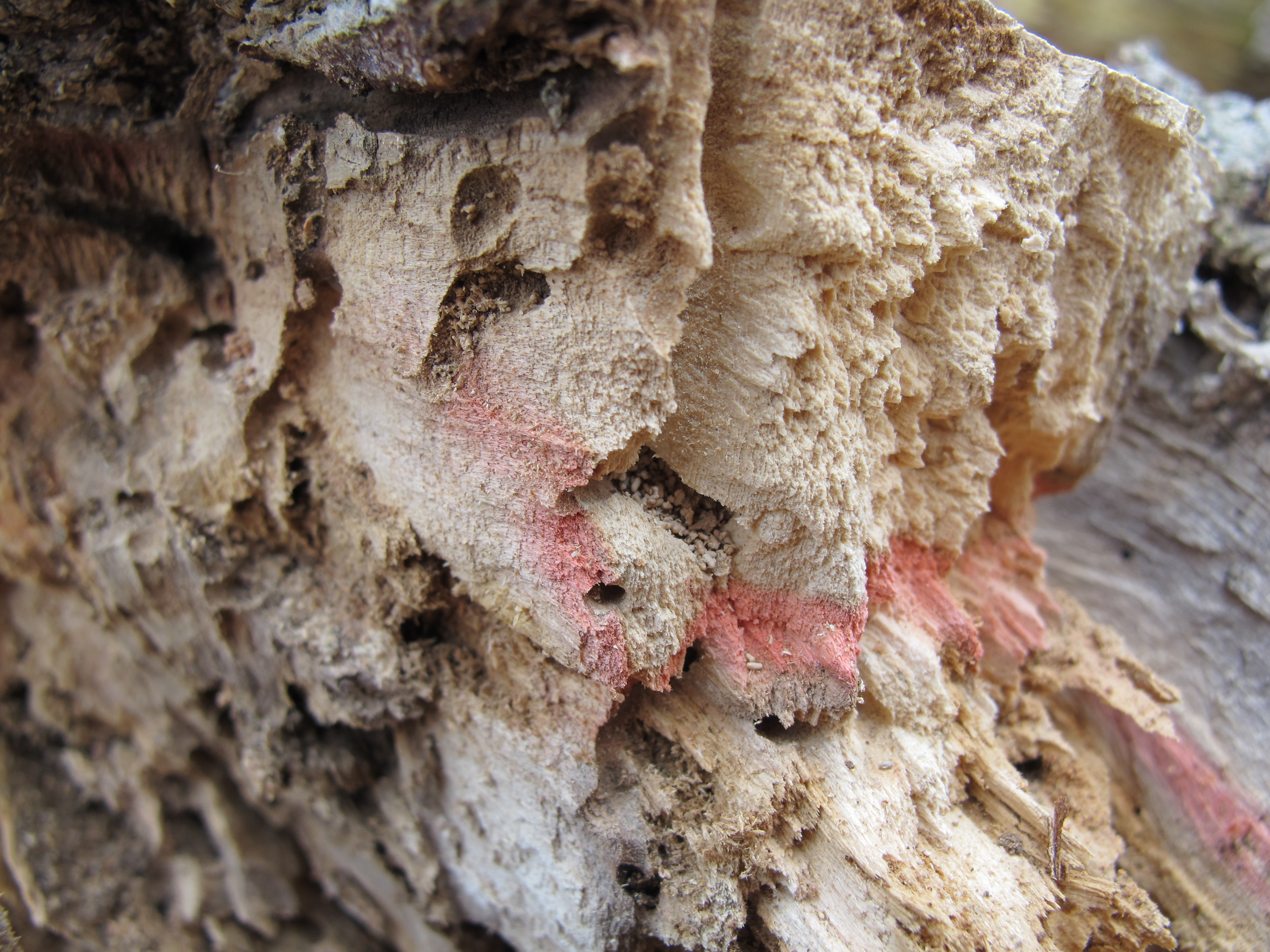
- Scytalidium cuboideum

Scientific classification
- Kingdom: Fungi
- Division: Ascomycota
- Class: Sordariomycetes
- Order: Sordariales
- Family: Chaetomiaceae
- Genus: Scytalidium; Pesante

Type species
- Scytalidium lignicola (now considered Neoscytalidium dimidiatum) Pesante

Species
- S. acidophilum S. album S. aurantiacum S. circinatum S. cuboideum S. dimidiatum (now Neoscytalidium dimidiatum); S. flavobrunneum S. ganodermophthorum S. hyalinum S. indonesiacum S. infestans S. japonicum S. multiseptatum S. muscorum S. terminale S. thermophilum S. uredinicola S. vaccinii

= Scytalidium =

Genus of fungi

Scytalidium is a genus of fungi in the Helotiales order. The relationship of this taxon to other taxa within the order is unknown (incertae sedis), and it has not yet been placed with certainty into any family. This genus of anamorphic fungi has a widespread distribution and contains 18 species. Scytalidium dimidiatum (preferentially known as Neoscytalidium dimidiatum) causes onychomycosis in tea leaf pluckers.
