= Onychauxis =

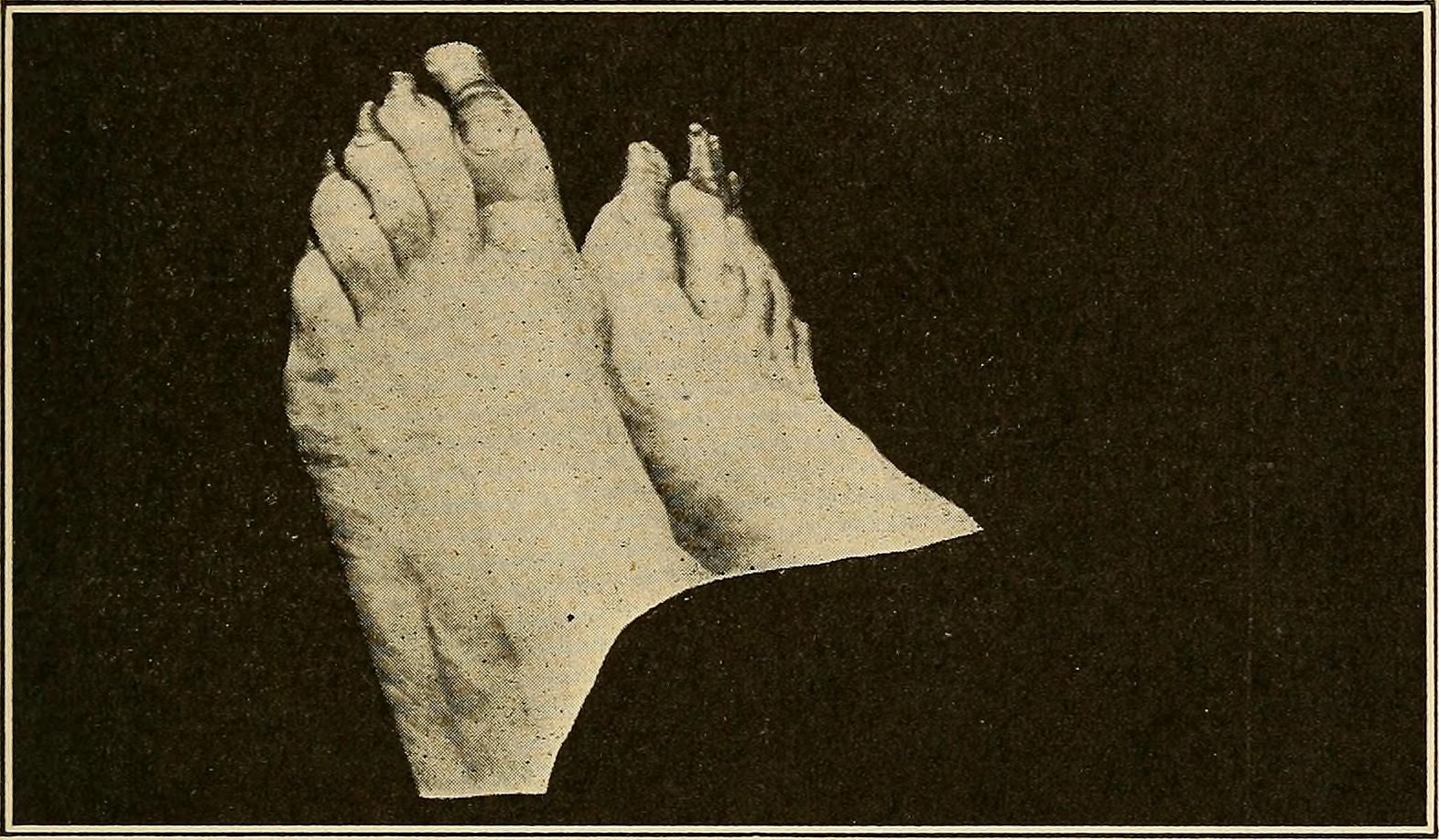
- Onychauxis
- Specialty: Medical genetics

Onychauxis presents with thickened nails without deformity, and this simple thickening may be the result of trauma, acromegaly, Darier's disease, psoriasis, or pityriasis rubra pilaris, or, in some cases, hereditary.

It may appear as loss of nail palate translucency, discoloration, and subungual hyperkeratosis. Complications include pain, distal onycholysis, subungual bleeding, subungual ulceration, and onychomycosis.

Treatment includes debridement of the nail plate, urea pastes, electric drills, nail avulsion, and chemical or surgical matricectomy.

== Signs and symptoms ==
Onychauxis frequently shows up clinically as discoloration, subungual hyperkeratosis, and loss of nail plate translucency. It may cause pain, and over time, distal onycholysis, subungual bleeding, subungual ulceration, or an elevated risk of onychomycosis might aggravate matters.

== Causes ==
Growing older or having poor biomechanics, which are more common in the elderly (e.g., toes that overlap and underlap; incompatibility between the foot and the shoe; or digiti flexi, which is characterized by contracted toes due to toe buckling caused by shortening of the controlling muscles), may be contributing factors.

== Treatment ==
The recommended first treatment is periodic partial or complete debridement of the thickening nail plate. Other potential treatments that could be helpful are urea pastes with a 40% or greater concentration, electric drills, and nail avulsion. In complex situations or those with recurrences, chemical or surgical matricectomy may be used as a last resort to accomplish permanent ablation of the affected nail plate.

== See also ==
- Onycholysis
- List of cutaneous conditions
