= Nattrassia =

Scientific classification
- Kingdom: Fungi
- Division: Ascomycota
- Class: Dothideomycetes
- Order: Botryosphaeriales
- Family: Botryosphaeriaceae
- Genus: Nattrassia

Species
- Nattrassia mangiferae (Neofusicoccum mangiferae)

Genus of fungi

Nattrassia is a genus of fungi in the family Botryosphaeriaceae for which there is the single species Nattrassia mangiferae. More recently this species has been reclassified into the family Neofusicoccum as Neofusicoccum mangiferae.
