= Ciclopirox =

Antifungal medication

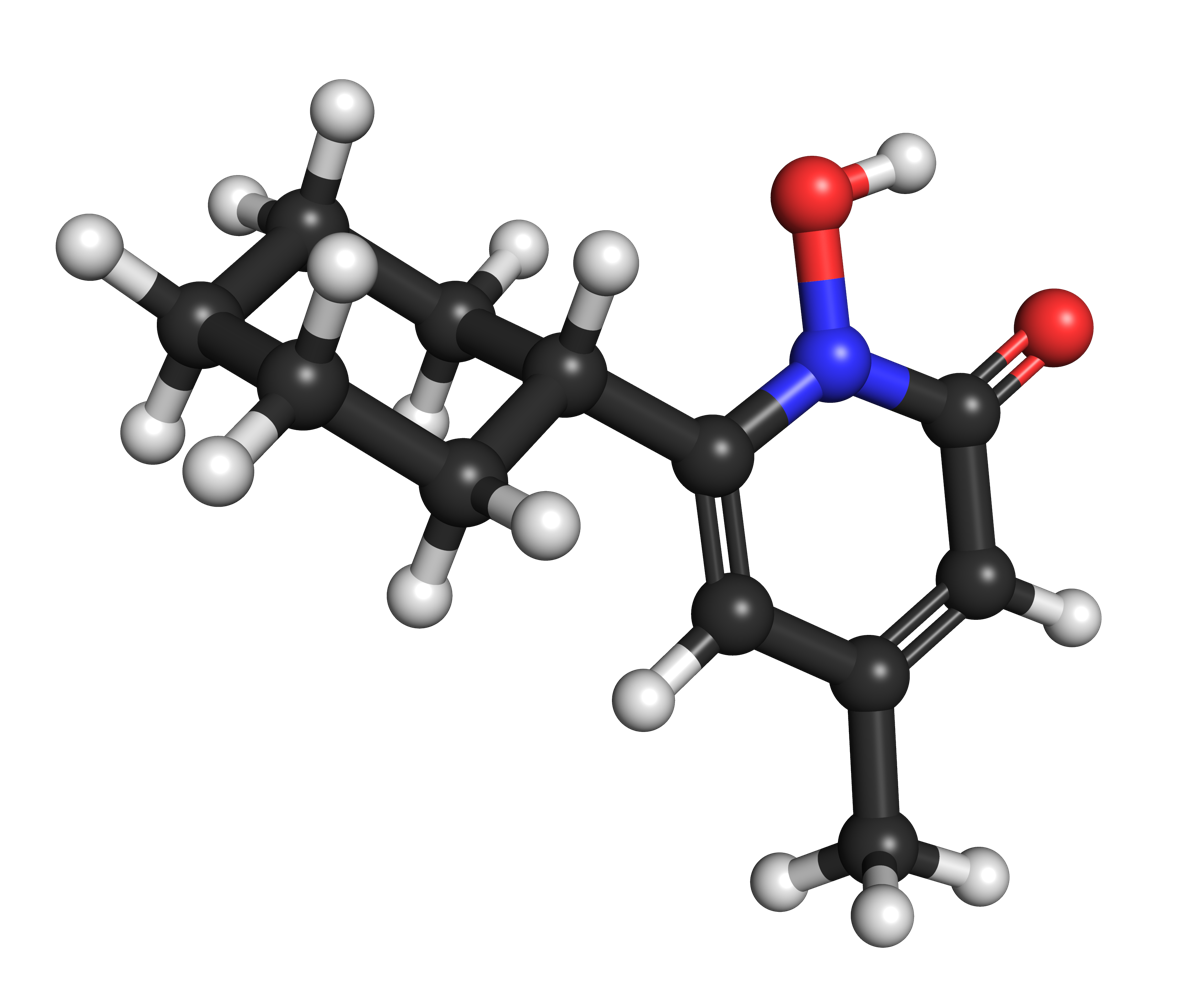
- Above: molecular structure of ciclopirox Below: 3D representation of a ciclopirox molecule

Clinical data
- Trade names: Penlac Nail Lacquer, others
- Other names: Loprox, CPX
- AHFS/Drugs.com: Monograph
- MedlinePlus: a604021
- License data: US DailyMed: Ciclopirox
- Routes of administration: Topical
- ATC code: D01AE14 (WHO) G01AX12 (WHO)

Legal status
- Legal status: AU: S2 (Pharmacy medicine); CA: ℞-only; US: ℞-only

Pharmacokinetic data
- Bioavailability: <5% with prolonged use
- Protein binding: 94 to 97%
- Elimination half-life: 1.7 hours

Identifiers
- IUPAC name: 6-cyclohexyl-1-hydroxy-4-methylpyridin-2(1H)-one
- CAS Number: 29342-05-0
- PubChem CID: 2749
- DrugBank: DB01188
- ChemSpider: 2647
- UNII: 19W019ZDRJ
- KEGG: D03488
- ChEBI: CHEBI:453011
- ChEMBL: ChEMBL1413
- CompTox Dashboard (EPA): DTXSID9048564
- ECHA InfoCard: 100.045.056

Chemical and physical data
- Formula: C_{12}H_{17}NO_{2}
- Molar mass: 207.273 g·mol^{−1}
- 3D model (JSmol): Interactive image
- SMILES: O=C1/C=C(\C=C(/N1O)C2CCCCC2)C
- InChI: InChI=1S/C12H17NO2/c1-9-7-11(13(15)12(14)8-9)10-5-3-2-4-6-10/h7-8,10,15H,2-6H2,1H3; Key:SCKYRAXSEDYPSA-UHFFFAOYSA-N

Ciclopirox is a medication used for the treatment of moderate onychomycosis of fingernails and toenails, and for the treatment of seborrheic dermatitis.

In 2023, it was the 278th most commonly prescribed medication in the United States, with more than 700,000 prescriptions.

== Medical uses ==
Ciclopirox is indicated as topical treatment in immunocompetent people with mild to moderate onychomycosis of fingernails and toenails without lunula involvement, due to Trichophyton rubrum, and for the treatment of seborrheic dermatitis.

=== Nail infections ===
In addition to other formulations, ciclopirox is used in lacquers for topical treatment of onychomycosis (fungal infections of the nails). A meta-analysis of the six trials of nail infections available in 2009 concluded that they provided evidence that topical ciclopirox had poor cure rates, and that amorolfine might be substantially more effective, but more research was required. "Combining data from 2 trials of ciclopiroxolamine versus placebo found treatments failure rates of 61% and 64% for ciclopiroxolamine. These outcomes followed long treatment times (48 weeks) and this makes ciclopiroxolamine a poor choice for nail infections. Better results were observed with the use of amorolfine lacquer; 6% treatment failure rates were found after 1 month of treatment but these data were collected on a very small sample of people and these high rates of success might be unreliable."

Efinaconazole, an azole antifungal, led to cure rates two or three times better than the next-best topical treatment, ciclopirox.

== Pharmacology ==
=== Pharmacodynamics ===
In contrast to the azoles and other antimycotic drugs, the mechanism of action of ciclopirox is poorly understood. However, loss of function of certain catalase and peroxidase enzymes has been implicated as the mechanism of action, as well as various other components of cellular metabolism. In a study conducted to further elucidate ciclopirox's mechanism, several Saccharomyces cerevisiae mutants were screened and tested. Results from interpretation of the effects of both the drug treatment and mutation suggested that ciclopirox may exert its effect by disrupting DNA repair, cell division signals and structures (mitotic spindles), as well as some elements of intracellular transport.

== Chemistry ==
Ciclopirox is a N-hydroxypyridone. Structurally, ciclopirox is the N-oxide of a 2-hydroxypyridine derivative and therefore can be termed a hydroxypyridine antifungal agent. Additionally, the structure as drawn above is the lactam tautomer which shows the molecule being an N-hydroxy-2-pyridone, hence the classification of ciclopirox as a 2-pyridone antifungal agent.

== Society and culture ==
=== Brand names ===
It is sold under many brand names worldwide.

== Research ==
In 2007, it was investigated as an alternative to ketoconazole for seborrhoeic dermatitis, as it suppresses growth of the yeast Malassezia furfur. Initial results showed similar efficacy to ketoconazole with a relative increase in subjective symptom relief due to its inherent anti-inflammatory properties.
