= Green nail syndrome =

- Other names: Chloronychia, Goldman–Fox syndrome
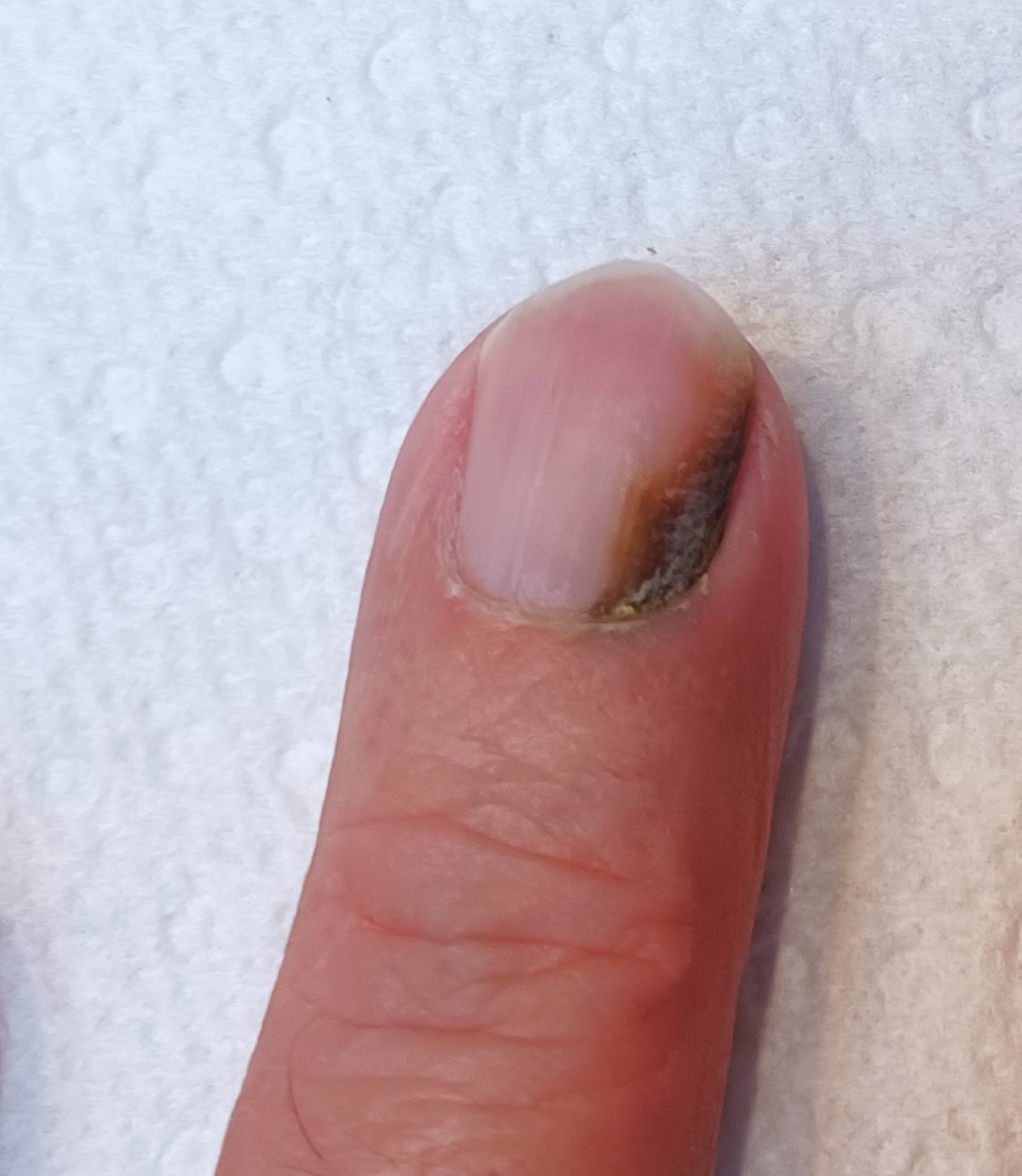
- Chloronychia affecting the nail of the ring finger
- Specialty: Dermatology

Green nail syndrome is an infection that can develop in individuals whose hands are frequently submerged in water resulting in discolouration of the nails from shades of green to black. It may also occur as transverse green stripes that are ascribed to intermittent episodes of infection. It is usually caused by the bacteria Pseudomonas aeruginosa and is linked to hands being constantly moist or exposed to chemicals, or in individuals who have damaged or traumatised nails. There are several activities and nail injuries or conditions that are linked to higher risk of contracting the condition.

== Symptoms and signs ==
Green nail syndrome (chloronychia or Goldman-Fox syndrome) is characterised by discolouration of the infected nail, inflammation of the skin around the nail known as paronychia, and an odour resembling fruit. The colour may range from light or blueish green or yellow-green to darker green or black. Nails may be separated from the nail bed (onycholysis) and may have green stripes from repeated infections. Chronic fungal infection (onychomycosis) may also be present.

== Causes ==
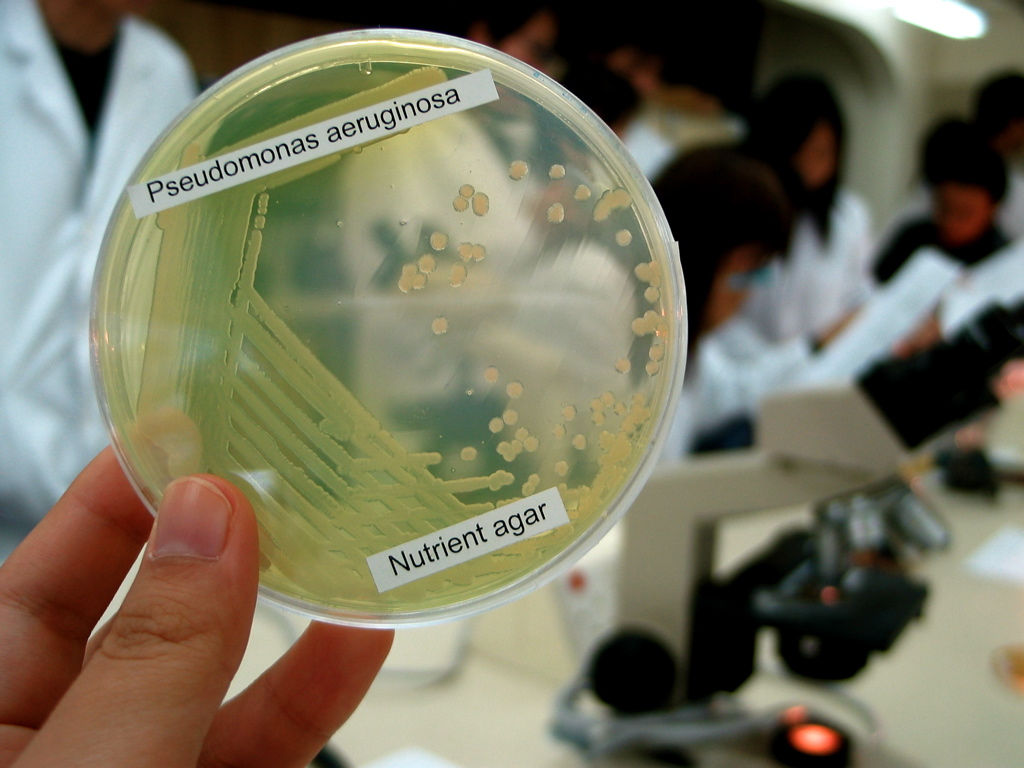
Pseudomonas aeruginosa is a common bacterial cause of green nail syndrome

Green nail syndrome is caused when the nail is exposed to a bacterial organism, which leads to opportunistic infection. Pseudomonas aeruginosa, the most common cause but not the only one, is frequently found in nature including in water sources, humans, animals and soil. These bacteria do not normally survive on dry, healthy skin, but can thrive in moist conditions. The seal between the nail and finger acts as a physical barrier to prevent infection, however hyper-hydration or destruction of the epidermis can impair the barrier, allowing the bacteria to colonise. The nail turns green due to the bacteria secreting pigments such as pyocyanin and pyoverdin.

=== Risk factors ===
Green nail syndrome occurs rarely in healthy individuals, but can occur in the immunocompromised or those whose hands are frequently immersed in water or who have other nail problems. The elderly and people who have had trauma to a finger or nail are at greater risk of contracting green nail syndrome.

Green nail syndrome has been linked to manicures, heat, dermatitis, ulcerations, occlusions and excess sweating. Higher risk of contracting the infection is also linked to soccer players and military personnel due to the prolonged periods of time in which they exercise while wear tight fitting shoes as well as immunosuppressed persons and those with a weakened epidermis barrier.

Pseudomonas can be transferred among clients in a nail salon if appropriate hygiene standards are not practiced, allowing transfer of the bacteria to clients. Artificial nails may be a contributing factor, and their use can result in diagnostic delay.

A man working in a job where he was regularly mixing chemicals developed green nails secondary to exposure to chemicals; he mostly wore latex gloves, but sometimes did not, and the type of gloves he used was inadequate, resulting in a constantly moist environment.

Cloronychia may be transferred to patients in clinics by medical practitioners, even when they are wearing gloves.

== Diagnosis ==
Diagnosis can typically be made from a physical examination of the nail, although cultures are sometimes needed. Nail scrapings can be performed to rule out fungal infections.

=== Differential diagnosis ===
Green nails may also be seen with Proteus mirabilis infection, in psoriasis, or because of use of triphenylmethane dyes or other stains and lacquers or chemical solutions. Melanoma is an infrequent differential diagnosis, which must be ruled out in hard-to-treat cases. Other differential diagnoses include hematoma and fungal infections (onychomycosis).

== Prevention ==
Preventative measures should be implemented by those who are most at risk of contracting green nail syndrome due to their predisposition or lifestyle and workplace choices. Wearing waterproof gloves or rubber boots can be effective in preventing prolonged exposure of the nails to water. Avoiding trauma that could lead to the destruction of the epidermis seal is on the nails is a priority in preventing green nail syndrome recurrences.

== Treatment ==
As of 2020, there have not been controlled, blinded studies on the treatment of green nail syndrome and there are no treatment guidelines as of 2021. Keeping the nails dry and avoiding excessive immersion of the nails are key. In some cases, surgical removal of the infected nail may be required, as a last choice. The patient is advised to avoid further trauma to the infected nail regardless of the treatment they received.

=== Pharmaceutical ===
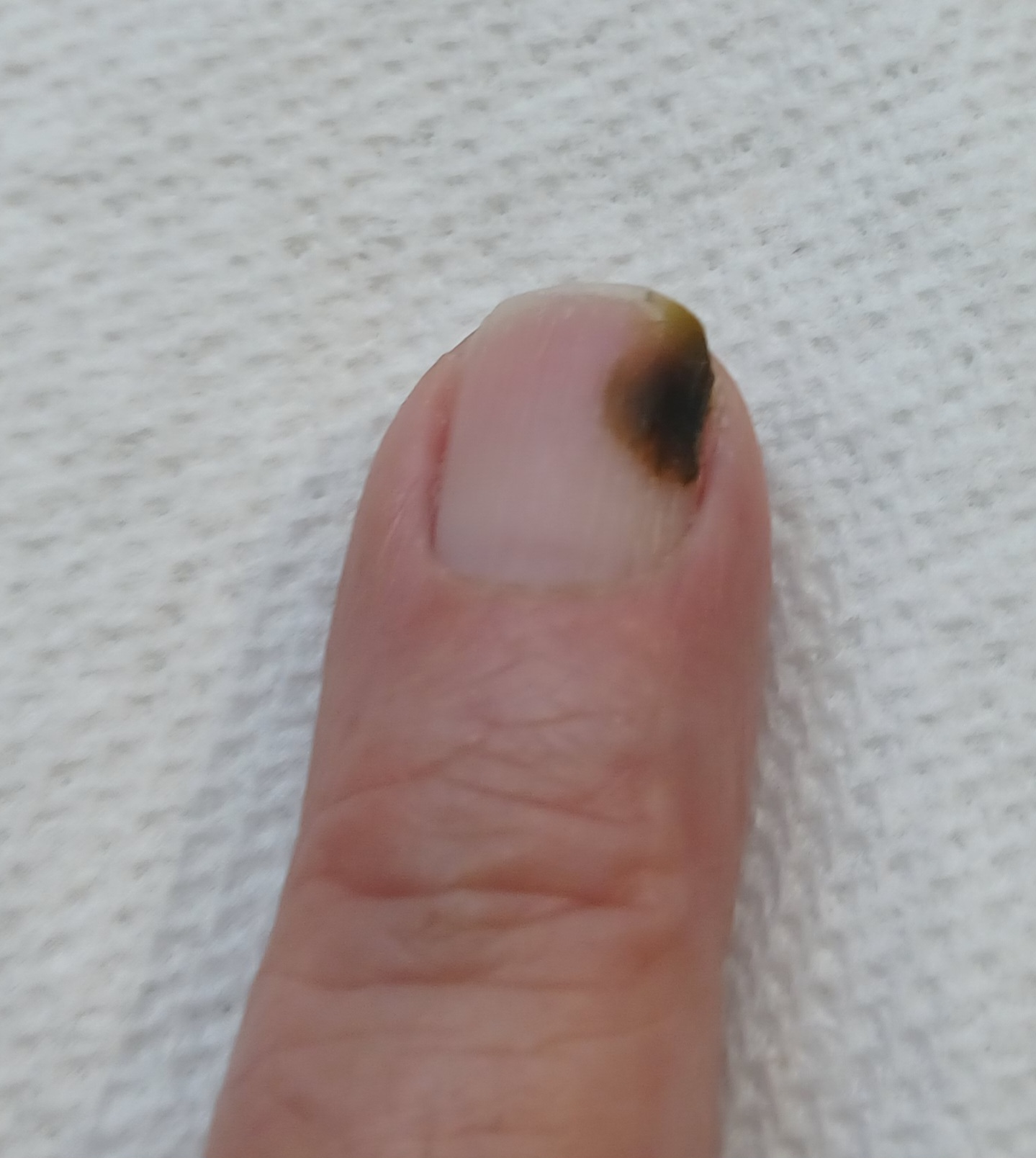
After topical antibiotic treatment, the discolored nail section is receding

Oral antibiotics are rarely necessary, helpful or recommended by all practitioners. Moderate cases of green nail syndrome may be prescribed topical antibiotics (silver sulfadiazine, gentamicin, ciprofloxacin, bacitracin and polymyxin B). Oral antibiotics are sometimes used if other therapies fail. Tobramycin eye drops are sometimes used.

=== Alternative ===
The least invasive treatment includes soaking the nail in alcohol and regularly trimming the nail back, to dry out the area and prevent bacterial colonization. Some at-home treatments include soaking the nails in vinegar (diluted with water 1:1) or a chlorine bleach solution (diluted with water 1:4) at regular intervals.

== History ==
Goldman–Fox syndrome was first described in 1944 by Leon Goldman, a dermatology professor at the University of Cincinnati, and Harry Fox.

== See also ==
- List of cutaneous conditions

== Works cited ==
=== Books ===
- Grover C, Rigopoulos D, Haneke E, Baran R, eds. (2021). Nail Therapies: Current Clinical Practice. CRC Press. pp. 111–113. ISBN 9781000366983.
- Hsu TS, Arndt KA, Schalock PC, eds. (2010). Lippincott's Primary Care Dermatology. Wolters Kluwer Health/Lippincott Williams & Wilkins. p. 398. ISBN 9780781793780.
- Zou X, Liu J (2022). Practical Dermoscopy. Springer Nature Singapore. p. 218. ISBN 9789811914607.

=== Journal reviews ===
- Schwartz RA, Reynoso-Vasquez N, Kapila R (2020). "Chloronychia: The Goldman-Fox Syndrome - Implications for Patients and Healthcare Workers". Indian J Dermatol. 65 (1): 1–4. doi:10.4103/ijd.IJD_277_19. PMC 6986112. PMID 32029931.
- Sierra-Maeda KY, Segundo-López LD, Vega DC, Juárez DE, Arenas R (January–March 2022). "Green nail syndrome: A review" (PDF). Dermatología Cosmética, Médica y Quirúrgica (in Spanish). 20 (1): 78–85.
- Spernovasilis N, Psichogiou M, Poulakou G (April 2021). "Skin manifestations of Pseudomonas aeruginosa infections". Curr Opin Infect Dis. 34 (2): 72–79. doi:10.1097/QCO.0000000000000717. PMID 33492004. S2CID 231703645.
