= Proximal subungual onychomycosis =

- Specialty: Infectious disease

Proximal subungual onychomycosis (PSO) is an infection of the nail plate by fungus, primarily affecting the proximal nailfold.

== See also ==
- Onychomycosis
- Skin lesion
