= Candidal onychomycosis =

- Specialty: Infectious diseases

Candidal onychomycosis is an infection of the nail plate by fungus caused by Candida. In one study Candida parapsilosis was the most common species; Candida albicans is also a common agent.

== See also ==
- Onychomycosis
- Skin lesion
