= Spalting =

Any form of coloration caused by a fungal infection in the wood

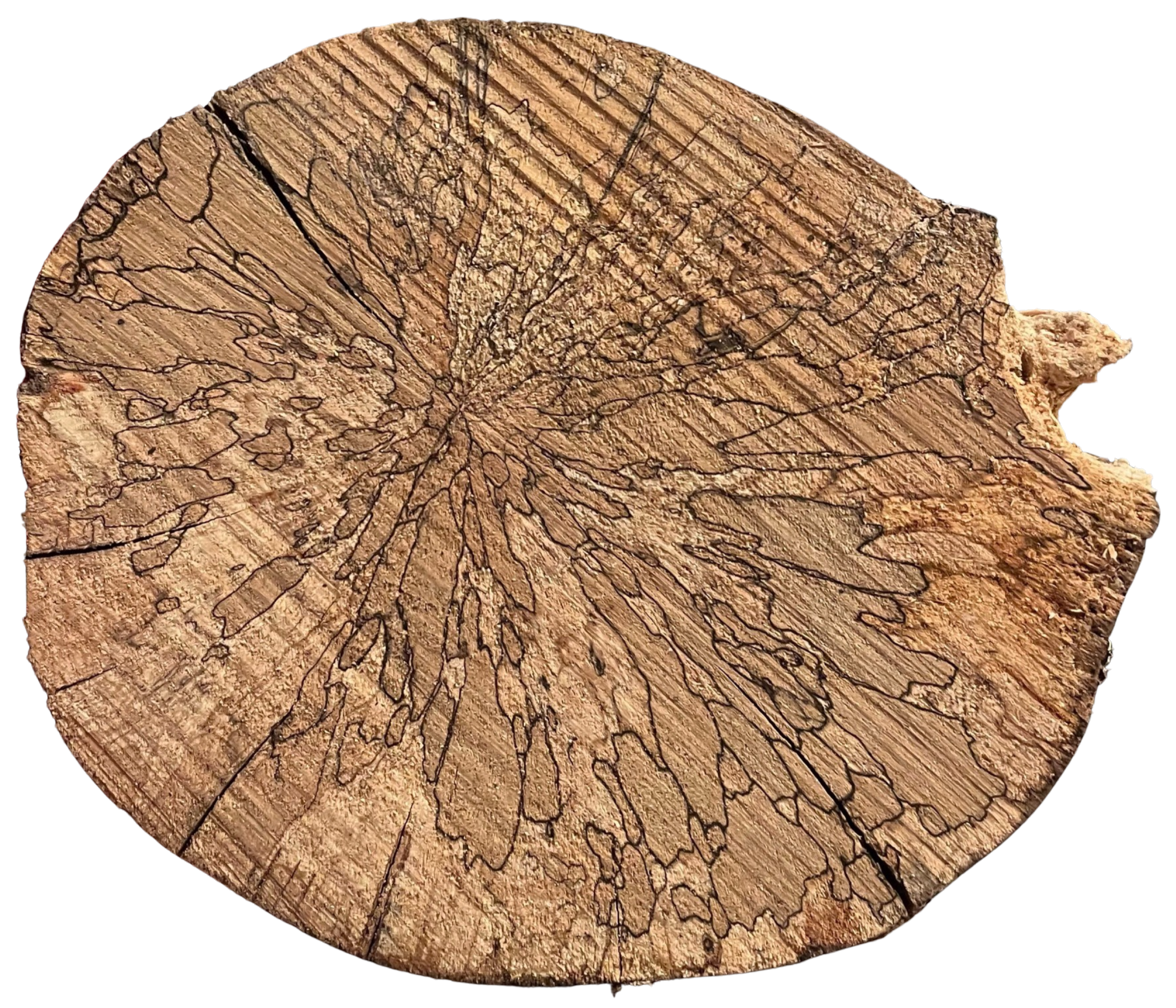
Zone lines in spalted wood

Spalting is any form of wood coloration caused by fungi. Although primarily found in dead trees, spalting can also occur in living trees under stress. Although spalting can cause weight loss and strength loss in the wood, the unique coloration and patterns of spalted wood are sought by woodworkers.

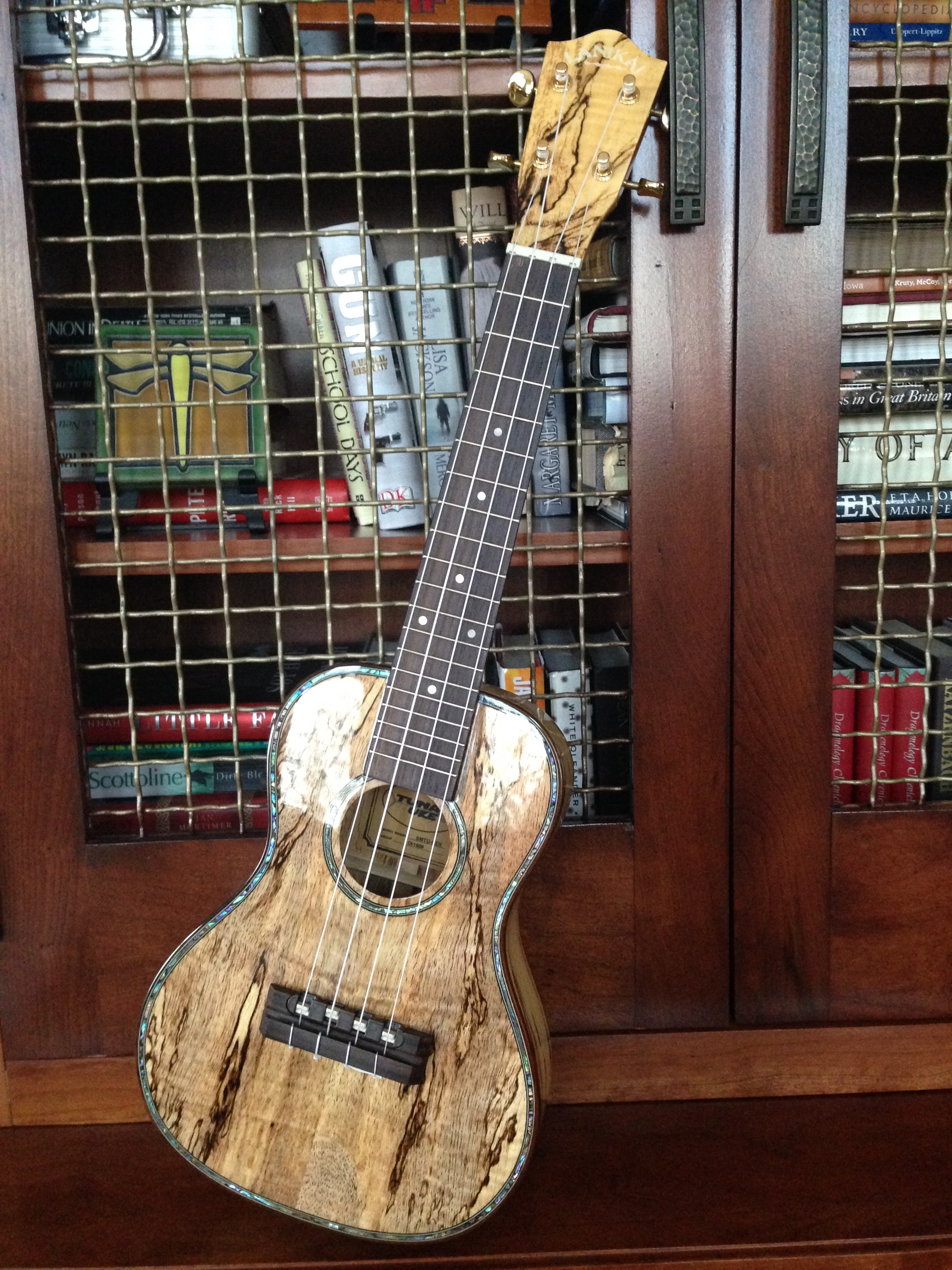
Heavily spalted mango wood is often used in the construction of ukuleles.

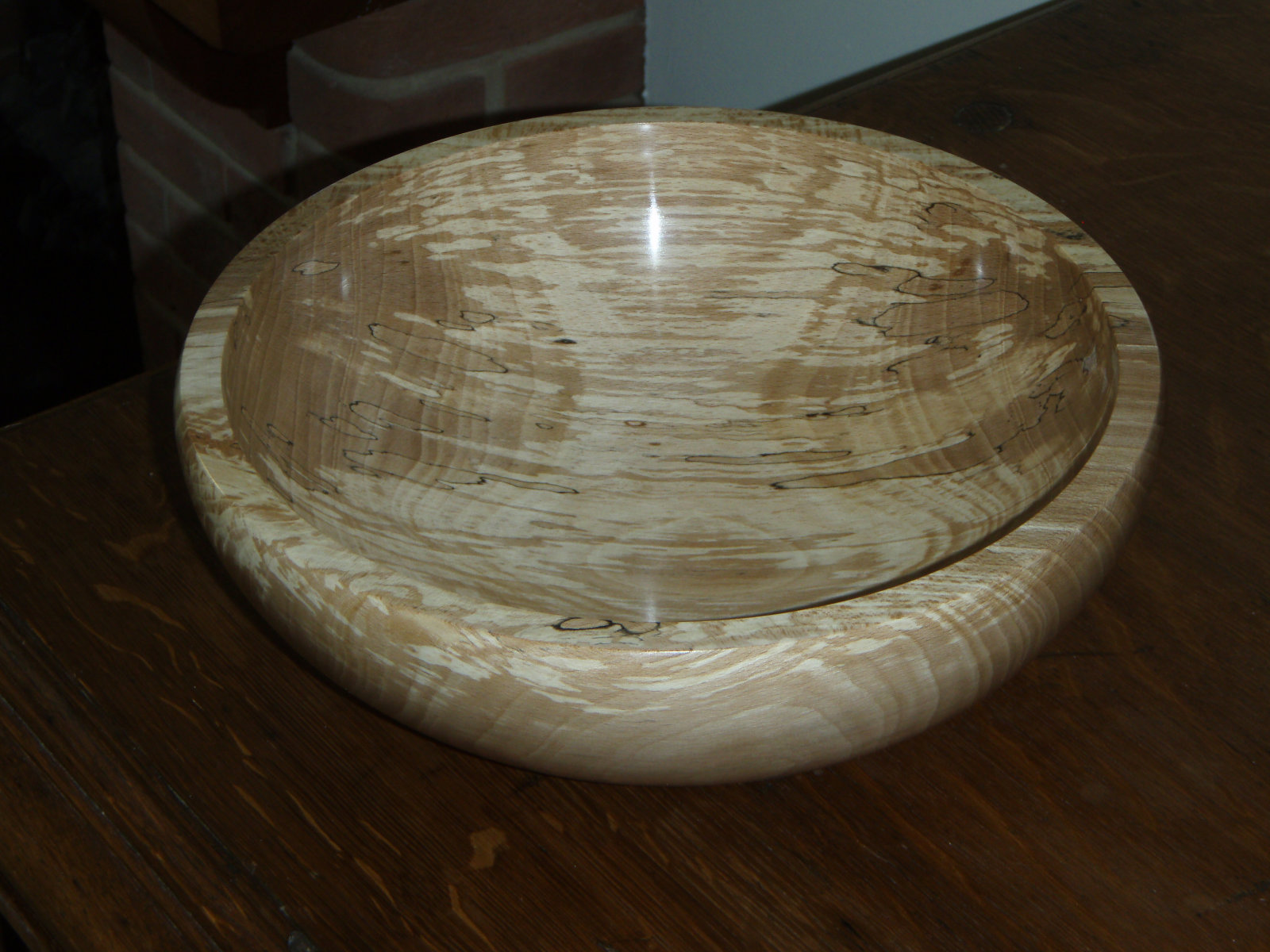
Spalted beech bowl

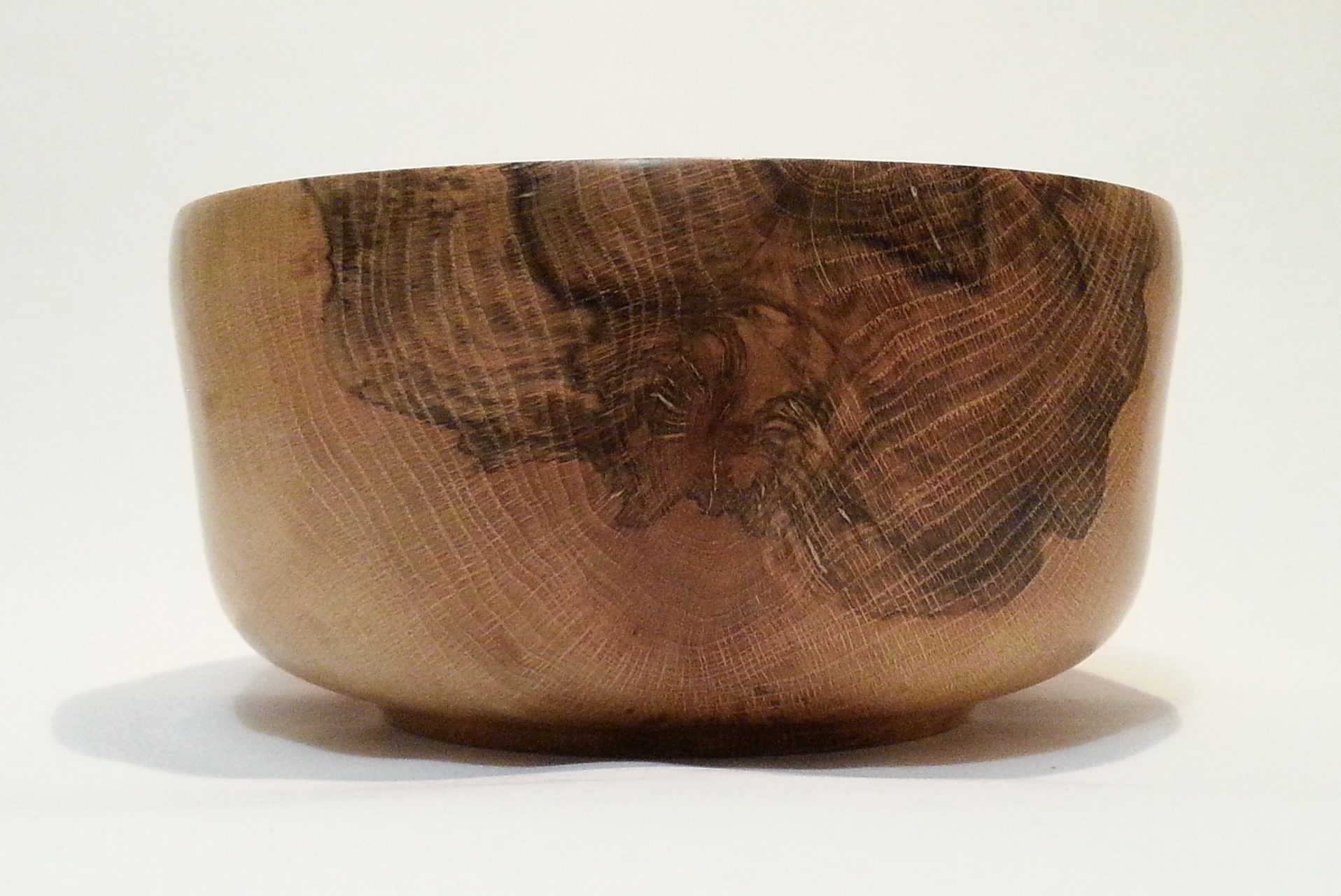
Spalted oak bowl

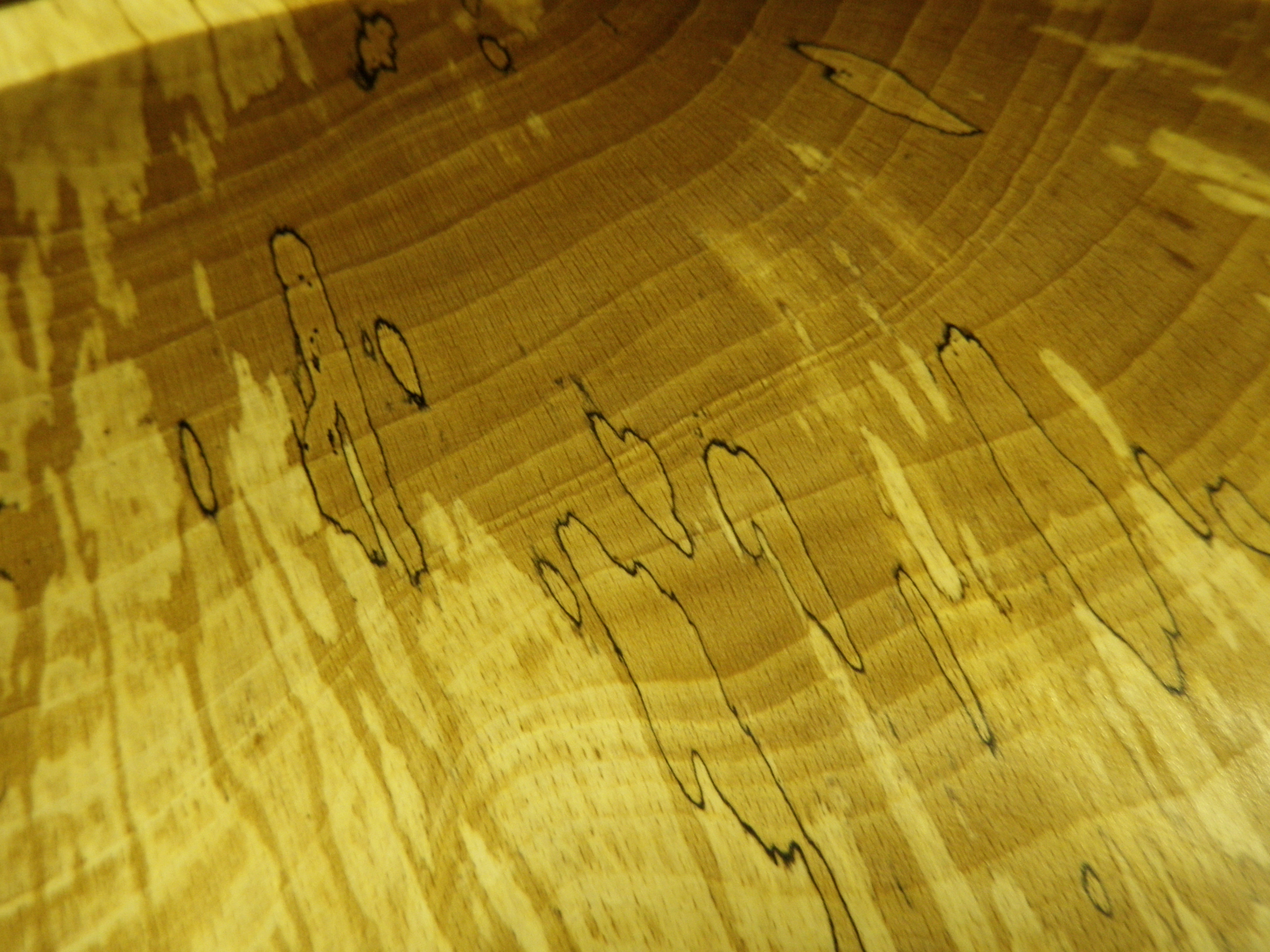
Macro of spalting in beech showing white rot and zone lines

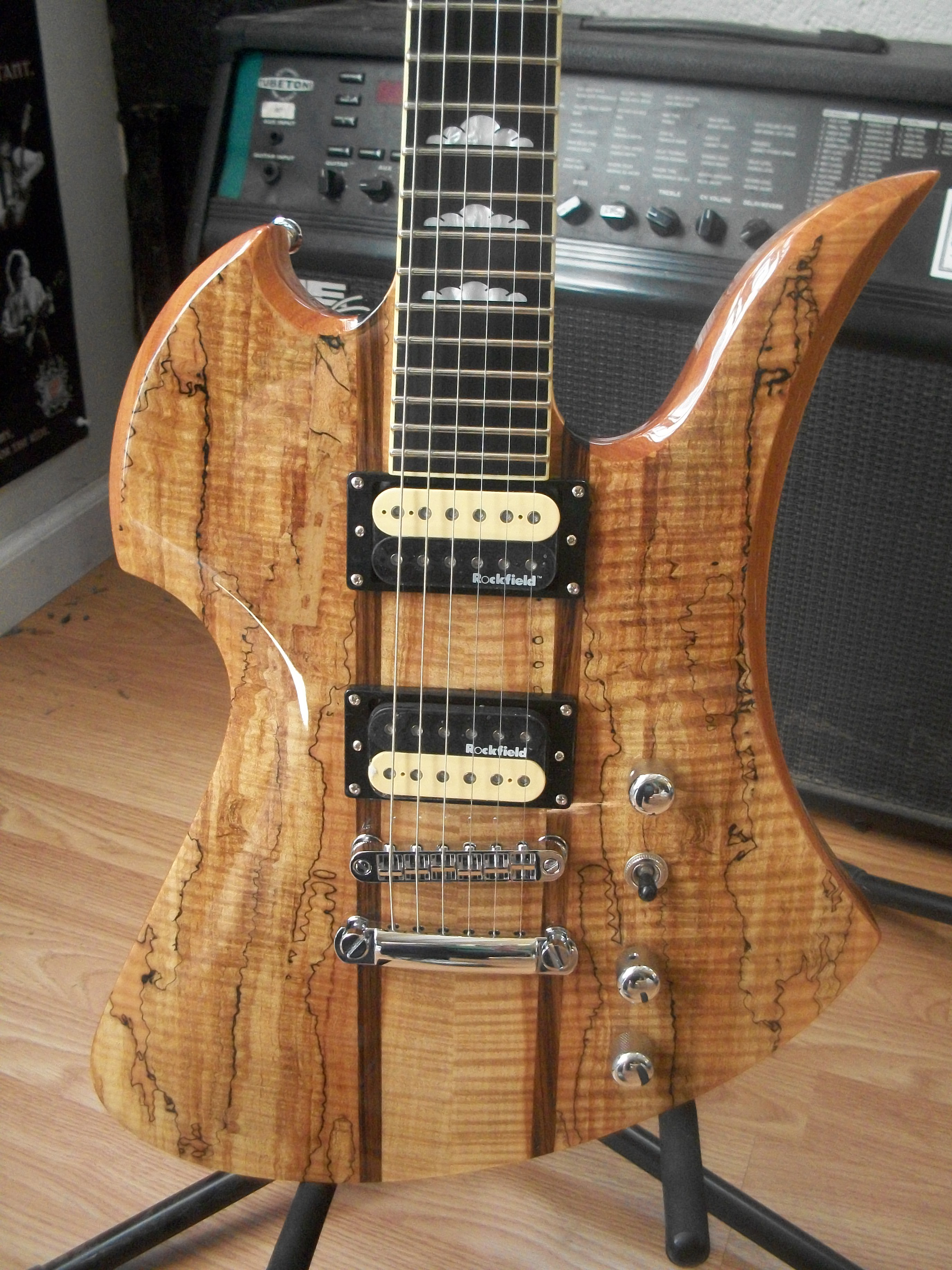
Spalted maple electric guitar

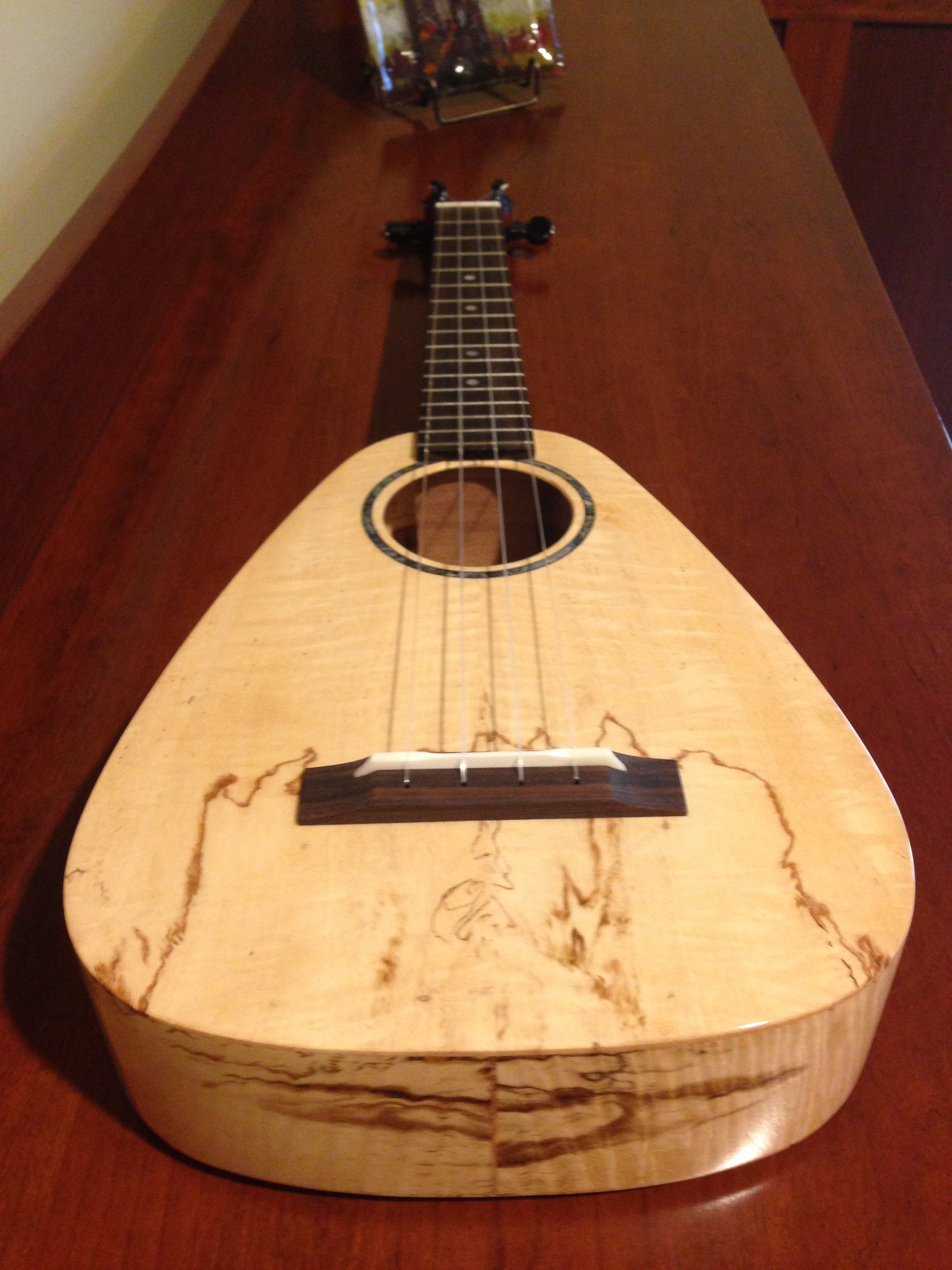
Mango wood with fine spalting was used to build this Romero Creations Tiny Tenor Ukulele

== Types ==
Spalting is divided into three main types: pigmentation, white rot, and zone lines. Spalted wood may exhibit one or all of these types in varying degrees. Both hardwoods (deciduous) and softwoods (coniferous) can spalt, but zone lines and white rot are more commonly found on hardwoods due to enzymatic differences in white rotting fungi. Brown rots are more common to conifers, although one brown rot, Fistulina hepatica (beefsteak fungus), is known to cause spalting among deciduous trees.

=== Pigmentation ===
Pigmentation is caused when fungi produce extracellular pigments inside wood. Bluestain is also a form of pigmentation; however, bluestain pigments are generally bound within the hyphae cell walls. A visible color change can be seen if enough hyphae are concentrated in an area. Pigmenting fungi classified as spalting fungi do decay wood, they simply do so at a slower rate (soft rotting) than white rotting fungi. The most common groups of pigmentation fungi are the imperfect fungi and the ascomycetes. Mold fungi, such as Trichoderma spp., are not considered to be spalting fungi, as their hyphae do not colonize the wood internally and they do not produce the enzymes necessary to digest the wood cell wall components.

=== White rot ===
The mottled white pockets and bleaching effect seen in spalted wood is due to white rot fungi. Primarily found on hardwoods, these fungi "bleach" by consuming lignin, which is the slightly pigmented area of a wood cell wall. Some white rotting can also be caused by an effect similar to pigmentation, in which the white hyphae of a fungus, such as Trametes versicolor (Fr.) Pil., is so concentrated in an area that a visual effect is created.

Both strength and weight loss occur with white rot decay, causing the "punky" area often referred to by woodworkers. Brown rots, the "unpleasing" type of spalting, do not degrade lignin, thus creating a crumbly, cracked surface which cannot be stabilized. Both types of rot, if uncontrolled, will render wood useless.

=== Zone lines ===
Dark dotting, winding lines and thin streaks of red, brown and black are known as zone lines. This type of spalting does not occur due to any specific type of fungus, but is instead an interaction zone in which different fungi have erected barriers to protect their resources. They can also be caused by a single fungus delineating itself. The lines are often clumps of hard, dark mycelium, referred to as pseudosclerotial plate formation.

Zone lines themselves do not damage the wood. However, the fungi responsible for creating them often do. Spalted wood is also sometimes known as web wood.

== Conditions ==
Conditions required for spalting are the same as the conditions required for fungal growth: fixed nitrogen, micronutrients, water, warm temperatures and oxygen.

Water: Wood must be saturated to a 20% moisture content or higher for fungal colonization to occur. Wood placed underwater lacks sufficient oxygen, and colonization cannot occur.

Temperature: The majority of fungi prefer warm temperatures between 10 and 40 °C, with rapid growth occurring between 20 and 32 °C.

Oxygen: Fungi do not require much oxygen, but conditions such as waterlogging will inhibit growth.

Time: Different fungi require different amounts of time to colonize wood. Research conducted on some common spalting fungi found that Trametes versicolor, when paired with Bjerkandera adusta, took eight weeks to spalt 1.5 inch (38 mm) cubes of Acer saccharum. Colonization continued to progress after this time period, but the structural integrity of the wood was compromised. The same study also found that Polyporus brumalis, when paired with Trametes versicolor, required 10 weeks to spalt the same size cubes.

== Commonly spalted woods ==
The Ohio Department of Natural Resources found that pale hardwoods had the best ability to spalt. Some common trees in this category include maple (Acer spp.), birch (Betula spp.) and beech (Fagus spp.). However, recent research suggests that sugar maple (Acer saccharum) and aspen (Populus sp.) are preferred by both white rot and pigment fungi.

== Common spalting fungi ==
One of the trickier aspects to spalting is that some fungi cannot colonize wood alone; they require other fungi to have preceded them to create favorable conditions. Fungi progress in waves of primary and secondary colonizers, where primary colonizers initially capture and control resources, change the pH of the wood and its structure, and then must defend against secondary colonizers that then have the ability to colonize the substrate.

Ceratocystis spp. (Ascomycetes) contains the most common blue stain fungi. Other pigmenting fungi include Chlorociboria aeruginascens, Chlorociboria aeruginosa, Scytalidium cuboideum, and Scytalidium ganodermophthorum. Trametes versicolor, (Basidiomycetes) is found all over the world and is a quick and efficient white rot of hardwoods. Xylaria polymorpha (Pers. ex Mer.) Grev. (Ascomycetes) has been known to bleach wood, but is unique in that it is one of the few fungi that will erect zone lines without any antagonism from other fungi.

== Research ==
Initial lab work was conducted on spalting in the 1980s at Brigham Young University. A method for improving machinability in spalted wood using methyl methacrylate was developed in 1982, and several white rot fungi responsible for zone line formation were identified in 1987. Current research at Michigan Technological University has identified specific time periods at which certain spalting fungi will interact, and how long it takes for said fungi to render the wood useless. Researchers from this university also developed a test for evaluating the machinability of spalted wood using a universal test machine.
