= Distal subungual onychomycosis =

- Specialty: Infectious diseases

Distal subungual onychomycosis is an infection of the nail plate by fungus, primarily involving the distal nail plate.

== See also ==
- Onychomycosis
- Skin lesion
