= Intraspecific antagonism =

Intraspecific antagonism means a disharmonious or antagonistic interaction between two individuals of the same species. As such, it could be a sociological term, but was actually coined by Alan Rayner and Norman Todd working at Exeter University in the late 1970s, to characterise a particular kind of zone line formed between wood-rotting fungal mycelia. Intraspecific antagonism is one of the expressions of a phenomenon known as vegetative or somatic incompatibility.

== Fungal individualism ==
Zone lines form in wood for many reasons, including host reactions against parasitic encroachment, and inter-specific interactions, but the lines observed by Rayner and Todd when transversely-cut sections of brown-rotted birch tree trunk or branch were incubated in plastic bags appeared to be due to a reaction between different individuals of the same species of fungus.

This was a startling inference at a time when the prevailing orthodoxy within the mycological community was that of the "unit mycelium". This was the theory that when two different individuals of the same species of basidiomycete wood rotting fungi grew and met within the substratum, they fused, cooperated, and shared nuclei freely. Rayner and Todd's insight was that basidiomycete fungi individuals do, in most "adult" or dikaryotic cases anyway, retain their individuality.

A small stable of postgraduate and postdoctoral students helped elucidate the mechanisms underlying these intermycelial interactions, at Exeter University (Todd) and the University of Bath (Rayner), over the next few years.

== Applications of intraspecific antagonism ==
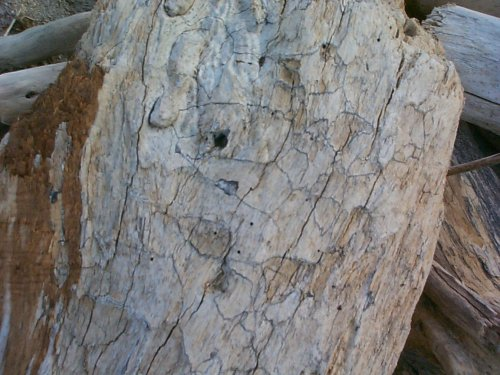
Zone lines in driftwood

Although the attribution of individual status to the mycelia confined by intraspecific zone lines is a comparatively new idea, zone lines themselves have been known since time immemorial. The term spalting is applied by woodworkers to wood showing strongly-figured zone lines, particularly those cases where the area of "no-man's land" between two antagonistic conspecific mycelia is colonised by another species of fungus. Dematiaceous hyphomycetes, with their dark-coloured mycelia, produce particularly attractive black zone lines when they colonise the areas occupied by two antagonistic basidiomycete individuals. Spalted wood can be difficult to work, since different individual wood-rotting fungi have different decay efficiencies, and thus produce zones of different softness, and the zone lines themselves are usually unrotted and hard.

Instraspecific antagonism can also sometimes be of assistance in quickly recognising the membership of clones in those fungi, particularly root-rots such as Armillaria where individual mycelia may colonise large areas, or more than one tree.

It is even the subject of a recent patent.
