= White superficial onychomycosis =

- Specialty: Dermatology

White superficial onychomycosis is an infection of the nail plate by fungus, primarily affecting the surface of the nail.

== See also ==
- Onychomycosis
- Skin lesion
