= Efinaconazole =

Chemical compound

Clinical data
- Trade names: Jublia, Clenafin
- AHFS/Drugs.com: Monograph
- MedlinePlus: a614050
- License data: US DailyMed: Efinaconazole; US FDA: Efinaconazole
- Routes of administration: Topical
- ATC code: D01AC19 (WHO)

Legal status
- Legal status: CA: ℞-only; US: ℞-only

Identifiers
- IUPAC name: (2R,3R)-2-(2,4-Difluorophenyl)-3-(4-methylene-1-piperidinyl)-1-(1H-1,2,4-triazol-1-yl)-2-butanol
- CAS Number: 164650-44-6
- PubChem CID: 489181
- DrugBank: DB09040
- ChemSpider: 428538
- UNII: J82SB7FXWB
- KEGG: D10021
- ChEBI: CHEBI:82718
- ChEMBL: ChEMBL2103877
- CompTox Dashboard (EPA): DTXSID40167787
- ECHA InfoCard: 100.245.862

Chemical and physical data
- Formula: C_{18}H_{22}F_{2}N_{4}O
- Molar mass: 348.398 g·mol^{−1}
- 3D model (JSmol): Interactive image
- SMILES: C[C@H]([C@](CN1C=NC=N1)(C2=C(C=C(C=C2)F)F)O)N3CCC(=C)CC3
- InChI: InChI=1S/C18H22F2N4O/c1-13-5-7-23(8-6-13)14(2)18(25,10-24-12-21-11-22-24)16-4-3-15(19)9-17(16)20/h3-4,9,11-12,14,25H,1,5-8,10H2,2H3/t14-,18-/m1/s1; Key:NFEZZTICAUWDHU-RDTXWAMCSA-N

Efinaconazole, sold under the brand name Jublia and Clenafin among others, is a triazole antifungal compound discovered by Kaken Pharmaceutical, indicated for the treatment of onychomycosis, a fungal infection of the nail. Since it has low binding affinity with keratin, the main component of nails, it has superior nail-penetrating properties. It is approved for use in the United States, Canada, Japan and certain European countries as a 10% topical solution.

Efinaconazole acts as a 14α-demethylase inhibitor.

== Medical uses ==
Efinaconazole is an azole antifungal indicated in the US for the topical treatment of onychomycosis of the toenails due to Trichophyton rubrum and Trichophyton mentagrophytes. Unlike nail lacquers it does not require debridement.

== Efficacy ==
The safety and efficacy of efinaconazole were established in two multi-centre randomised clinical trials with a total of 1,655 participants. 17.8% (trial 1) and 15.2% (trial 2) of participants using efinaconazole were completely cured (0% clinical involvement of the target toenail, plus negative KOH test and negative culture), compared with 3.3% (trial 1) and 5.5% (trial 2) of participants using a placebo. The "complete cure or almost complete cure" rate (≤5% affected target toenail area involved, and negative KOH and culture) for efinaconazole was 26.4% (trial 1) and 23.4% (trial 2) (compared with 7.0% (trial 1) and 7.5% (trial 2)).

In 2020, the FDA approved a supplemental New Drug Application for efinaconazole topical solution, 10%, which extended the age range included in the product's label to children six years of age and older.

== History ==
Efinaconazole was discovered by Japan dermatology company Kaken Pharmaceutical. In 2014, the U.S. Food and Drug Administration (FDA) approved the New Drug Application (NDA). According to Valeant Pharmaceuticals International Inc CEO J. Michael Pearson they acquired Jublia through their purchase of Dow Pharmaceutical Sciences in 2008. Japan and Korean approvals followed. In 2024, Almirall announced completion of decentralized regulatory approval procedure for Jublia in Europe.

== Economics ==
In 2015, the cost of treatment with efinaconazole in the United States was said to be US$2,307 per nail.

In 2019, a study by the Canadian Agency for Drugs and Technologies in Health found the cost for a 48-week course to be $178 for a big toe, and $89 for an other toe.

A 2025 review of nine online Canadian pharmacies shows that the price for a four-week treatment is about $143 USD. Therefore a 48-week course of treatment is about 12 x $143 = $1716.

A generic version has been approved in the USA but will not be available until 2035 due to patent protection.
