= Dermatomycosis =

Fungal infection of the skin

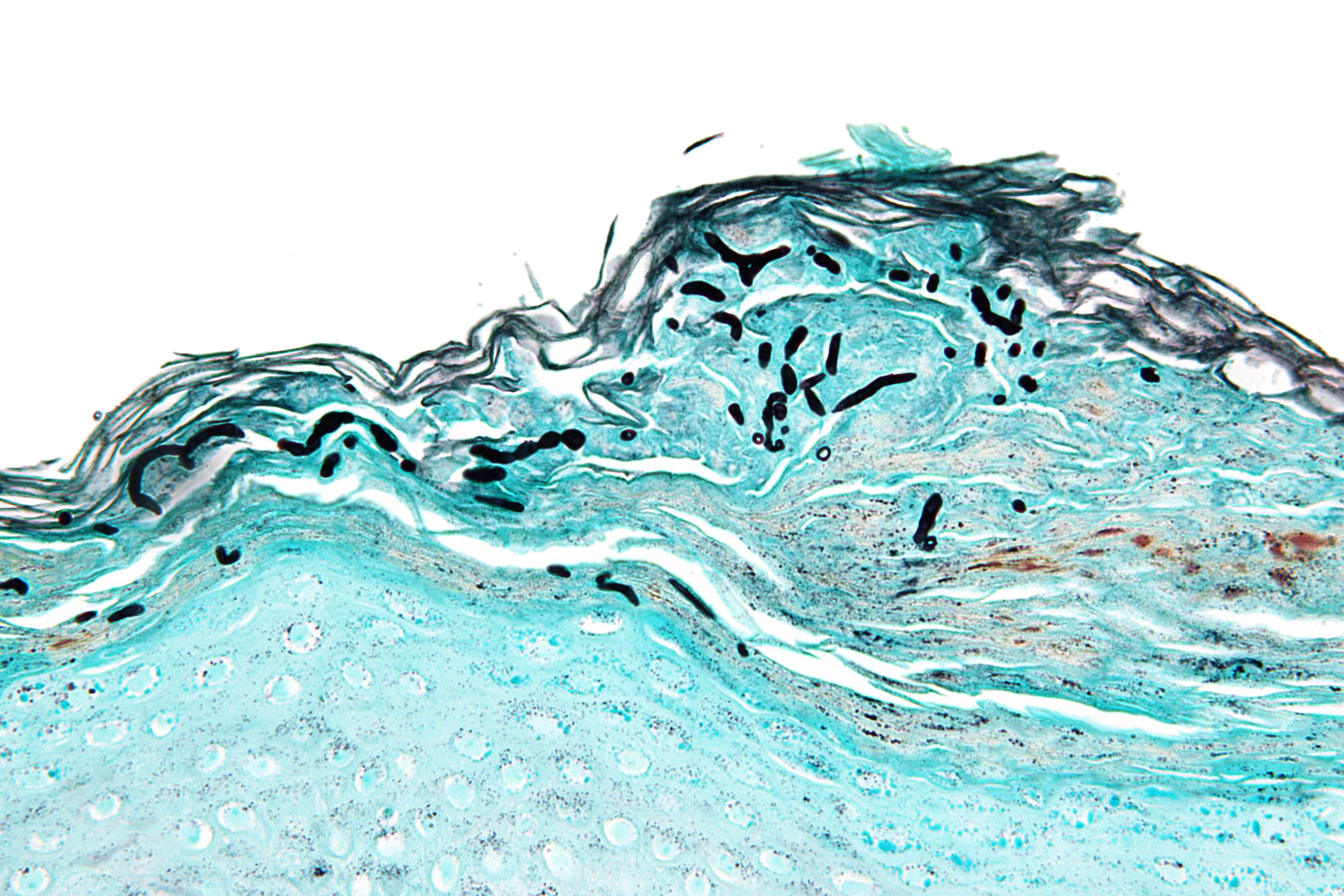
- Micrograph of a superficial dermatomycosis. The fungal organisms are the dark staining, thick, quasi-linear objects below with skin surface. Vulvar biopsy. GMS stain.
- Specialty: Infectious diseases
- Symptoms: Rash, skin irritation, skin eruptions
- Causes: Infection by a fungus

A dermatomycosis is a skin disease caused by a fungus. Most dermatomycoses are mild and resolve without treatment, but many are treated clinically with topical antifungal medicines. Oral antifungals are also an option for treatment.

One of the most frequent forms is dermatophytosis (ringworm, tinea) which includes tinea pedis, also known as athlete's foot. Another example is cutaneous candidiasis. These fungal infections impair superficial layers of the skin, hair and nails.

Dermatomycosis is one of the most common types of infection worldwide. In some populations, over 20% of people have a dermatomycosis, which is typically not severe enough to prompt them to visit a clinic. Many are treated with over-the-counter antifungal treatments.

For details of individual conditions, see the fungal infection and mesomycetozoea template.

== See also ==
- Fungal infection
- Skin infection
