= Onychomycosis =

- Other names: Dermatophytic onychomycosis tinea unguium
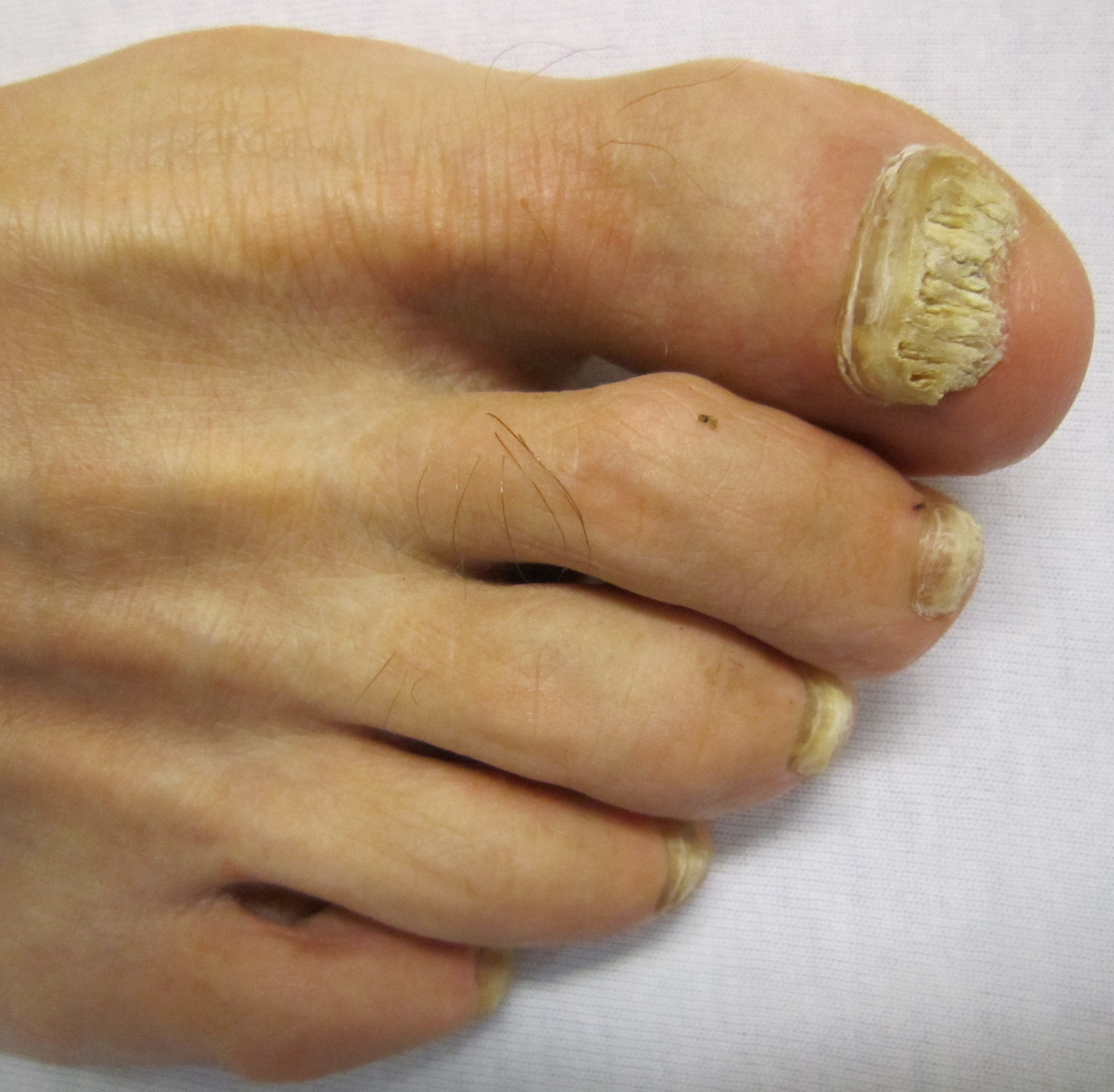
- A toenail affected by onychomycosis
- Specialty: Infectious disease
- Symptoms: White or yellow nail discoloration, thickening of the nail
- Complications: Lower leg cellulitis
- Usual onset: Older males
- Causes: Fungal infection
- Risk factors: Athlete's foot, other nail diseases, exposure to someone with the condition, peripheral vascular disease, poor immune function
- Diagnostic method: Based on appearance, confirmed by laboratory testing
- Differential diagnosis: Psoriasis, chronic dermatitis, chronic paronychia, nail trauma
- Treatment: None, anti-fungal medication, trimming the nails
- Medication: Terbinafine, ciclopirox
- Prognosis: Often recurs
- Frequency: ~10% of adults

Onychomycosis, also known as tinea unguium, is a fungal infection of the nail. Symptoms may include white or yellow nail discoloration, thickening of the nail, and separation of the nail from the nail bed. Fingernails may be affected, but it is more common for toenails. Complications may include cellulitis of the lower leg. A number of different types of fungus can cause onychomycosis, including dermatophytes and Fusarium. Risk factors include athlete's foot, other nail diseases, exposure to someone with the condition, peripheral vascular disease, and poor immune function. The diagnosis is generally suspected based on the appearance and confirmed by laboratory testing.

Onychomycosis does not necessarily require treatment. The antifungal medication terbinafine taken by mouth appears to be the most effective but is associated with liver problems. Trimming the affected nails when on treatment also appears useful.

There is a ciclopirox-containing nail polish, but as of 2013, there was no evidence that it works. The condition returns in up to half of cases following treatment. Not using old shoes after treatment may decrease the risk of recurrence.

Onychomycosis occurs in about 5.5% of the global population and 10 percent of the adult population, with older people more frequently affected. Males are affected more often than females. Onychomycosis represents about half of nail disease. It was first determined to be the result of a fungal infection in 1853 by Georg Meissner.

== Signs and symptoms ==
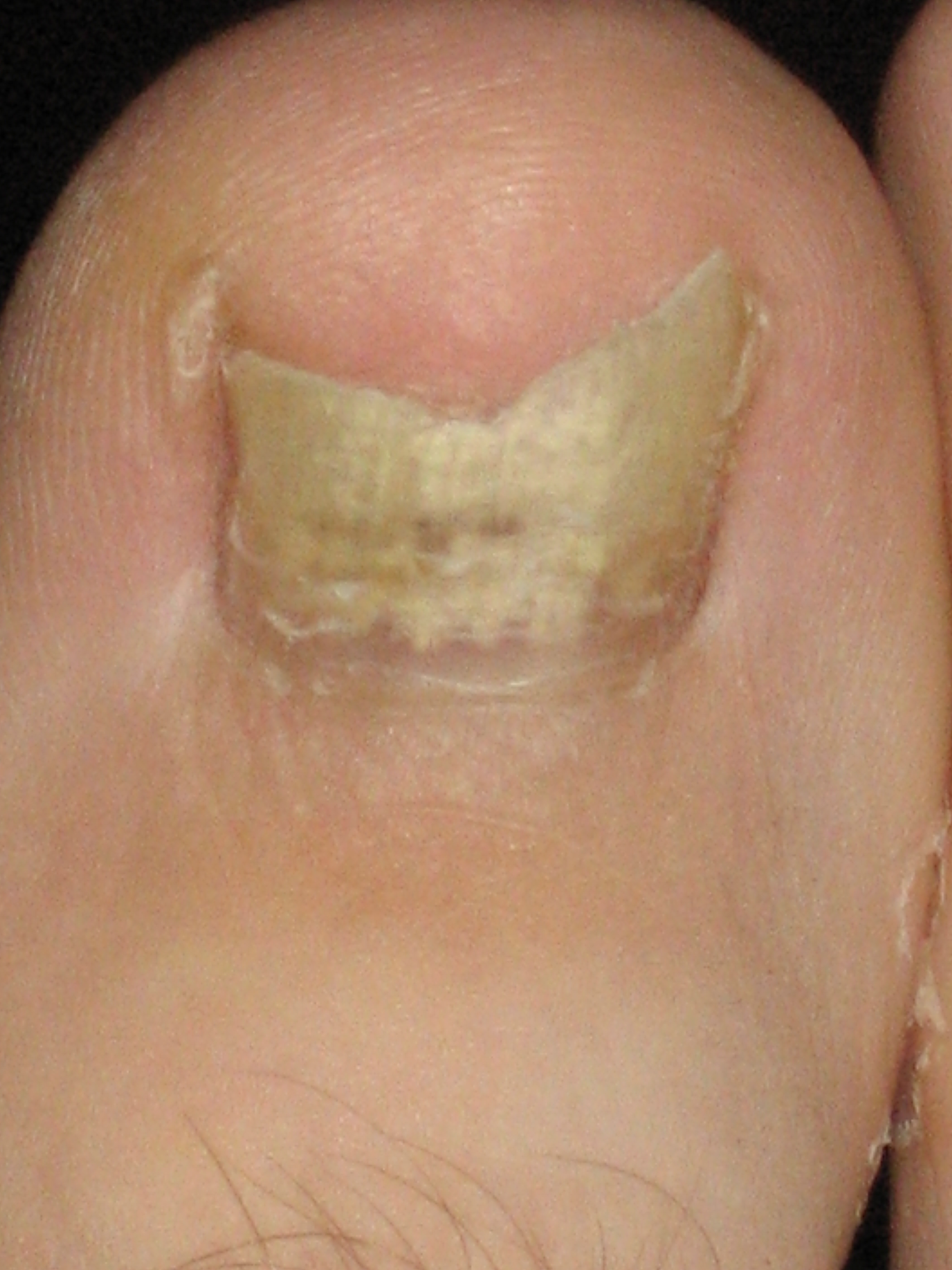
A case of fungal infection of the big toe

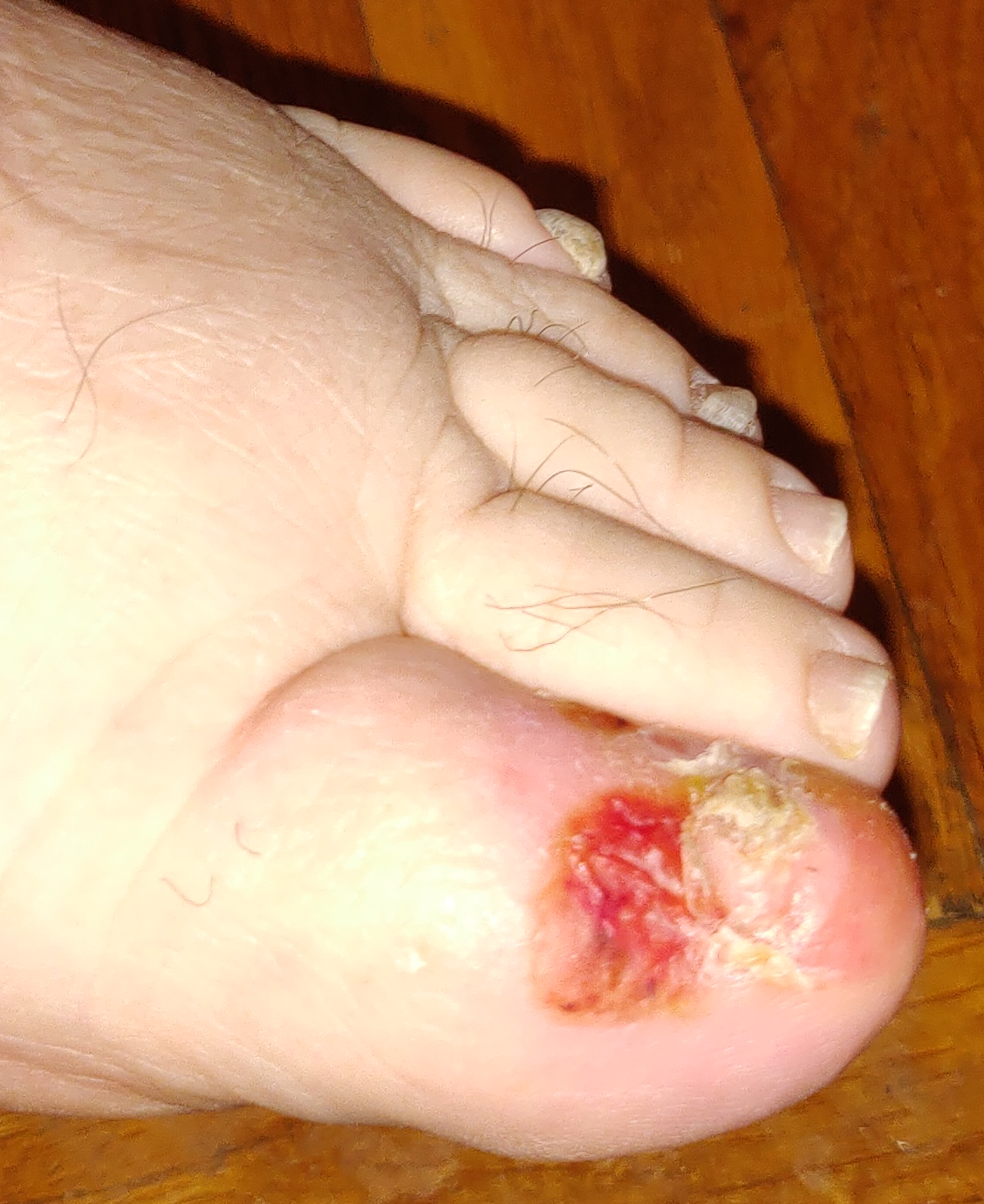
Advanced fungal infection of the big toe

The most common symptom of a fungal nail infection is the nail becoming thickened and discoloured: white, black, yellow or green. As the infection progresses, the nail can become brittle, with pieces breaking off or coming away from the toe or finger completely. If left untreated, the skin underneath and around the nail can become inflamed and painful. There may also be white or yellow patches on the nailbed or scaly skin next to the nail, and a foul smell. There is usually no pain or other bodily symptoms, unless the disease is severe. People with onychomycosis may experience significant psychosocial problems due to the appearance of the nail, particularly when fingers, which are always visible, rather than toenails are affected. Dermatophytids are fungus-free skin lesions that sometimes form as a result of a fungus infection in another part of the body. This could take the form of a rash or itch in an area of the body that is not infected with the fungus. Dermatophytids can be thought of as an allergic reaction to the fungus.

== Causes ==
The causative pathogens of onychomycosis are all in the fungus kingdom and include dermatophytes, Candida (yeasts), and nondermatophytic molds. Dermatophytes are the fungi most commonly responsible for onychomycosis in the temperate western countries; while Candida and nondermatophytic molds are more frequently involved in the tropics and subtropics with a hot and humid climate.

=== Dermatophytes ===
When onychomycosis is due to a dermatophyte infection, it is termed tinea unguium. Trichophyton rubrum is the most common dermatophyte involved in onychomycosis. Other dermatophytes that may be involved are T. interdigitale, Epidermophyton floccosum, Tricholosporum violaceum, Microsporum gypseum, T. tonsurans, and T. soudanense. A common outdated name that may still be reported by medical laboratories is Trichophyton mentagrophytes for T. interdigitale. The name T. mentagrophytes is now restricted to the agent of favus skin infection of the mouse; though this fungus may be transmitted from mice and their danders to humans, it generally infects skin and not nails.

=== Other ===
Other causative pathogens include Candida and nondermatophytic molds, in particular members of the mold genus Neoscytalidium (previously called Scytalidium), Scopulariopsis, and Aspergillus. Candida species mainly cause fingernail onychomycosis in people whose hands are often submerged in water. Scytalidium mainly affects people in the tropics, though it persists if they later move to areas of temperate climate.

Other molds more commonly affect people older than 60 years, and their presence in the nail reflects a slight weakening in the nail's ability to defend itself against fungal invasion.

Nail injury and nail psoriasis can cause damaged toenails to become thick, discolored, and brittle.

=== Risk factors ===
Advancing age (usually over the age of 60) is the most common risk factor for onychomycosis due to diminished blood circulation, longer exposure to fungi, nails that grow more slowly and thicken, and reduced immune function, increasing susceptibility to infection. Nail fungus tends to affect men more often than women and is associated with a family history of this infection.

Other risk factors include perspiring heavily, being in a humid or moist environment, psoriasis, wearing socks and shoes that hinder ventilation and do not absorb perspiration, going barefoot in damp public places such as swimming pools, gyms and shower rooms, having athlete's foot (tinea pedis), minor skin or nail injury, damaged nail, or other infection, and having diabetes, circulation problems, which may also lead to lower peripheral temperatures on hands and feet, or a weakened immune system.

== Diagnosis ==
The diagnosis is generally suspected based on the appearance and confirmed by laboratory testing. The four main tests are a KOH (potassium hydroxide) smear, culture, histology examination, and polymerase chain reaction. The sample examined is generally nail scrapings or clippings. These are from as far up the nail as possible.

Nail plate biopsy with periodic acid-Schiff stain appear more useful than culture or direct KOH examination. To reliably identify nondermatophyte molds, several samples may be necessary.

=== Classification ===
There are five classic types of onychomycosis:

- Distal subungual onychomycosis is the most common form of tinea unguium and is usually caused by Trichophyton rubrum, which invades the nail bed and the underside of the nail plate.
- White superficial onychomycosis (WSO) is caused by fungal invasion of the superficial layers of the nail plate to form "white islands" on the plate. It accounts for around 10 percent of onychomycosis cases. In some cases, WSO is a misdiagnosis of "keratins granulations" which are not a fungus, but a reaction to nail polish that can cause the nails to have a chalky white appearance. A laboratory test should be performed to confirm.
- Proximal subungual onychomycosis is fungal penetration of the newly formed nail plate through the proximal nail fold. It is the least common form of tinea unguium in healthy people, but is found more commonly when the patient is immunocompromised.
- Endonyx onychomycosis is characterized by leukonychia along with a lack of onycholysis or subungual hyperkeratosis.
- Candidal onychomycosis is Candida species invasion of the fingernails, usually occurring in persons who frequently immerse their hands in water. This normally requires the prior damage of the nail by infection or trauma.

=== Differential diagnosis ===
In many cases of suspected nail fungus there is actually no fungal infection, but only nail deformity.

To avoid misdiagnosis as nail psoriasis, lichen planus, contact dermatitis, nail bed tumors such as melanoma, trauma, or yellow nail syndrome, laboratory confirmation may be necessary.

Other conditions that may appear similar to onychomycosis include: psoriasis, normal aging, green nail syndrome, yellow nail syndrome, and chronic paronychia.

== Treatment ==
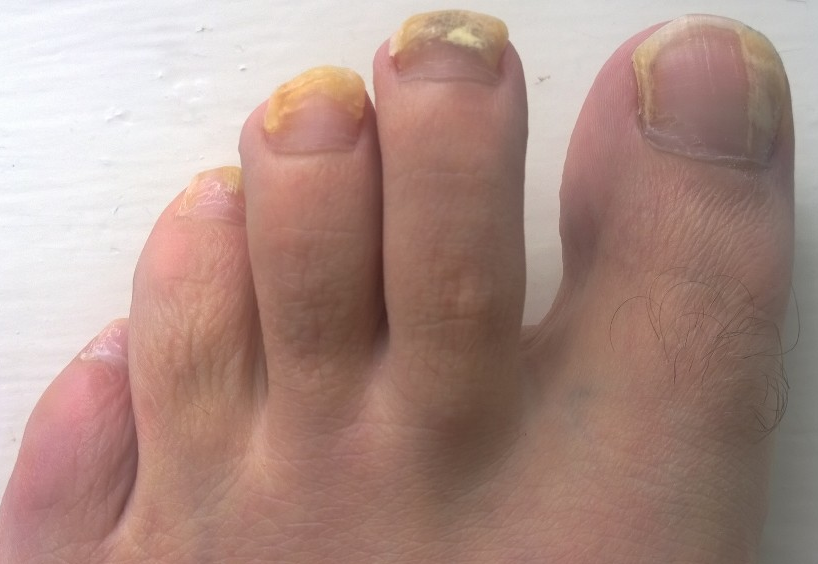
A person's foot with a fungal nail infection ten weeks into a course of terbinafine oral medication. Note the band of healthy (pink) nail growth behind the remaining infected nails.

=== Medications ===
Most treatments are with antifungal medications, either topically or by mouth. Avoiding use of antifungal therapy by mouth (e.g., terbinafine) in persons without a confirmed infection is recommended, because of the possible side effects of that treatment. The first topical terbinafine medication (MOB-015) was launched in February 2024 in Sweden under the name Terclara. This medication recorded 76% mycological cure rate in two phase 3 studies. The topical property of this medication ensures that typical terbinafine side effects are not present (1000 times lower terbinafine levels in plasma). Terclara (MOB-015) was released in Norway in February 2025. Release in 11 European countries in 2026. Roll-out in other countries will continue in the coming years.

Medications that may be taken by mouth include terbinafine (76% effective), itraconazole (60% effective), and fluconazole (48% effective). They share characteristics that enhance their effectiveness: prompt penetration of the nail and nail bed, and persistence in the nail for months after discontinuation of therapy. Ketoconazole by mouth is not recommended due to side effects. Oral terbinafine is better tolerated than itraconazole. For superficial white onychomycosis, systemic rather than topical antifungal therapy is advised.

Topical agents include ciclopirox nail paint, amorolfine, and efinaconazole. Some topical treatments need to be applied daily for prolonged periods (at least one year). Topical amorolfine is applied weekly.

Efinaconazole, a topical azole antifungal, led to cure rates two or three times better than the next-best topical treatment, ciclopirox. In trials, about 17% of people were cured using efinaconazole, as opposed to 4% of people using a placebo.

Topical ciclopirox results in a cure in 6% to 9% of cases. Ciclopirox, when used with terbinafine, appears to be better than either agent alone. Although eficonazole, P-3051 (ciclopirox 8% hydrolacquer), and tavaborole are effective at treating fungal infection of toenails, complete cure rates are low.

=== Other ===
Chemical (keratolytic) or surgical debridement of the affected nail appears to improve outcomes.

As of 2014, evidence for laser treatment is unclear as the evidence is of low quality.

Tea tree oil is not recommended as a treatment on present data. It was found to irritate the surrounding skin in some trial participants.

=== Cost ===
==== United States ====
According to a 2015 study, the cost in the United States of testing with the periodic acid–Schiff stain (PAS) was about $148. Even if the cheaper KOH test is used first and the PAS test is used only if the KOH test is negative, there is a good chance that the PAS will be done (because of either a true or a false negative with the KOH test). But the terbinafine treatment costs only $10 (plus an additional $43 for liver function tests). In conclusion, the authors say that terbinafine has a relatively benign adverse effect profile, with liver damage very rare, so it makes more sense cost-wise for the dermatologist to prescribe the treatment without doing the PAS test. (Another option would be to prescribe the treatment only if the potassium hydroxide test is positive, but it gives a false negative in about 20% of cases of fungal infection.) On the other hand, as of 2015, the price of topical (non-oral) treatment with efinaconazole was $2307 per nail, so testing is recommended before prescribing it.

The cost of efinaconazole treatment can be reduced to $65 per 1-month dose using drug coupons, bringing the treatment cost to $715 per nail.

==== Canada ====
In 2019, a study by the Canadian Agency for Drugs and Technologies in Health found the cost for a 48-week efinaconazole course to be $178 for a big toe and $89 for a different toe.

== Prognosis ==
Recurrence may occur following treatment, with a 20–25% relapse rate within 2 years of successful treatment. Nail fungus can be painful and cause permanent damage to nails. It may lead to other serious infections if the immune system is suppressed due to medication, diabetes, or other conditions. The risk is most serious for people with diabetes and with immune systems weakened by leukemia or AIDS, or medication after an organ transplant. Diabetics have vascular and nerve impairment, and are at risk of cellulitis, a potentially serious bacterial infection; any relatively minor injury to feet, including a nail fungal infection, can lead to more serious complications. Infection of the bone is another rare complication.

== Epidemiology ==
A 2003 survey of diseases of the foot in 16 European countries found onychomycosis to be the most frequent fungal foot infection and estimated its prevalence at 27%. Prevalence was observed to increase with age. In Canada, the prevalence was estimated to be 6.48%. Onychomycosis affects approximately one-third of diabetics and is 56% more frequent in people with psoriasis.

== Etymology ==
The term is from Ancient Greek ὄνυξ onyx "nail", μύκης mykēs "fungus", and the suffix -ωσις ōsis "functional disease".

== Research ==
Research suggests that fungi are sensitive to heat, typically 40–60 °C (104–140 °F). The basis of laser treatment is to try to heat the nail bed to these temperatures to disrupt fungal growth. As of 2013, research into laser treatment seemed promising. There is also ongoing development in photodynamic therapy, which uses laser or LED light to activate photosensitisers that eradicate fungi.
