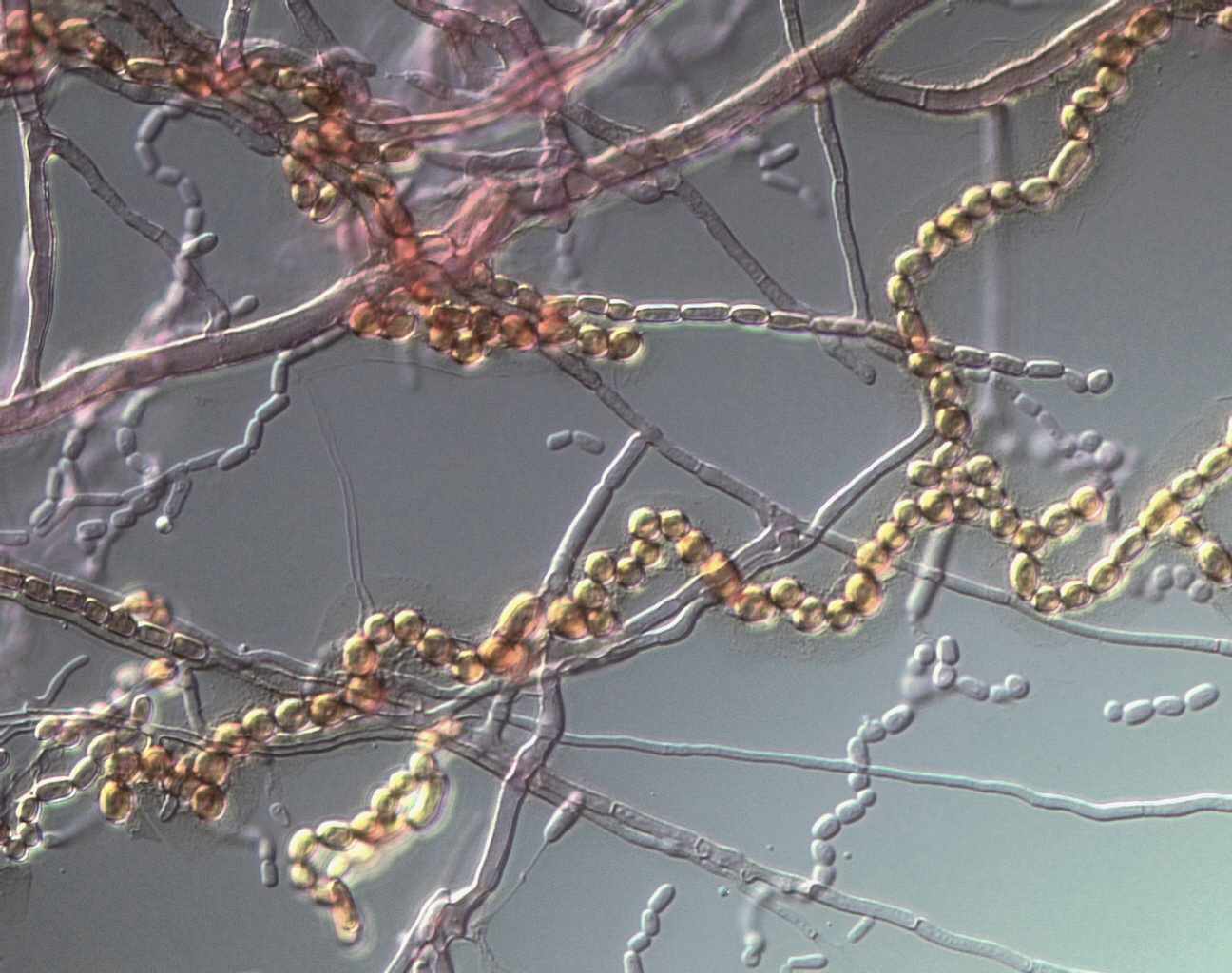

Scientific classification
- Kingdom: Fungi
- Division: Ascomycota
- Class: Dothideomycetes
- Order: Botryosphaeriales
- Family: Botryosphaeriaceae
- Genus: Neoscytalidium
- Species: N. dimidiatum

Binomial name
- Neoscytalidium dimidiatum (Penz.) Crous & Slippers (2006)

Synonyms
- Torula dimidiata Penz. (1882); Hendersonula toruloidea Nattrass (1933); Scytalidium dimidiatum (Penz.) B. Sutton & Dyko (1989); Fusicoccum dimidiatum (Penz.) D.F. Farr (2005)

= Neoscytalidium dimidiatum =

Species of fungus

Neoscytalidium dimidiatum was first described in 1933 as Hendersonula toruloidea from diseased orchard trees in Egypt. Decades later, it was determined to be a causative agent of human dermatomycosis-like infections and foot infections predominantly in tropical areas; however the fungus is considered to be widespread. A newer name, Scytalidium dimidiatum, was applied to a synanamorph of Nattrassia mangiferae, otherwise known as Neofusicoccum mangiferae. Substantial confusion has arisen in the literature on this fungus resulting from the use of multiple different names including Torula dimidiata, Fusicoccum dimidiatum, Scytalidium dimidiatum, and Hendersonula toruloidea. Additionally, Scytalidium lignicola and Scytalidium lignicolum are often considered earlier names of N. dimidiatum.

== History and taxonomy ==
In 1933, British mycologist Dr. Rolland Marshall Nattrass described an arthroconidial asexual fungus that he named H. toruloidea that was responsible for causing die-back disease of plum, apricot and apple trees in Egypt. At the time, he recognized that single spore cultures of the fungus yielded two "forms" in culture – a mycelial form resembling members of the genus Torula that produced fragmenting chains of arthroconidia, and a pycnidial form characterized by the production of greenish, ellipsoidal spores that oozed from tiny sacs. The name H. toruloidea applied to the latter pycnidial form. Others likened the Torula form to Torula dimidiata described by Otto Penzig in 1882. Despite that the fungus was known by this name for over 50 years by one or the other of these names, increased scrutiny of the species and its close relatives using molecular genetic methods spawned significant controversy in its taxonomy and naming.

In 1989 Sutton and Dyko created the genus Nattrassia to accommodate H. toruloidea and applied the name Scytalidium dimidiatum to the mycelial synanamorph. They also included in the new genus Nattrassia a fungus described by father-son mycologists Paul and Hans Sydow as Dothiorella mangiferae, which became Nattrassia mangiferae, thought to be very closely related to and perhaps indistinguishable from Nattrass's original pycnidial form. Farr and coworkers recognized that both states were asexual forms affiliated with the genus Fusicoccum, an anamorph of the plant pathogenic ascomycete genus, Botryosphaeria. They proposed the transfer of Scytalidium dimidiatum to the genus Fusicoccum as F. dimidiatum. A reappraisal of the family Botryosphaeriaceae by Crous and coworkers in 2006 concluded that the genus Fusicoccum was polyphyletic, and they created a new genus, Neoscytalidium to accommodate Nattrass's fungus. Separately they erected the genus Neofusicoccum to accommodate Nattrassia mangiferae. Crous and colleagues concluded it inappropriate to collapse the entirety of Scytalidium with Fusicoccum because they demonstrated N. dimidiatum to be phylogenetically distinct from Neofusicoccum mangiferae; thus, they interpreted N. dimidiatum to be the correct name for Nattrass's fungus.

== Growth and morphology ==
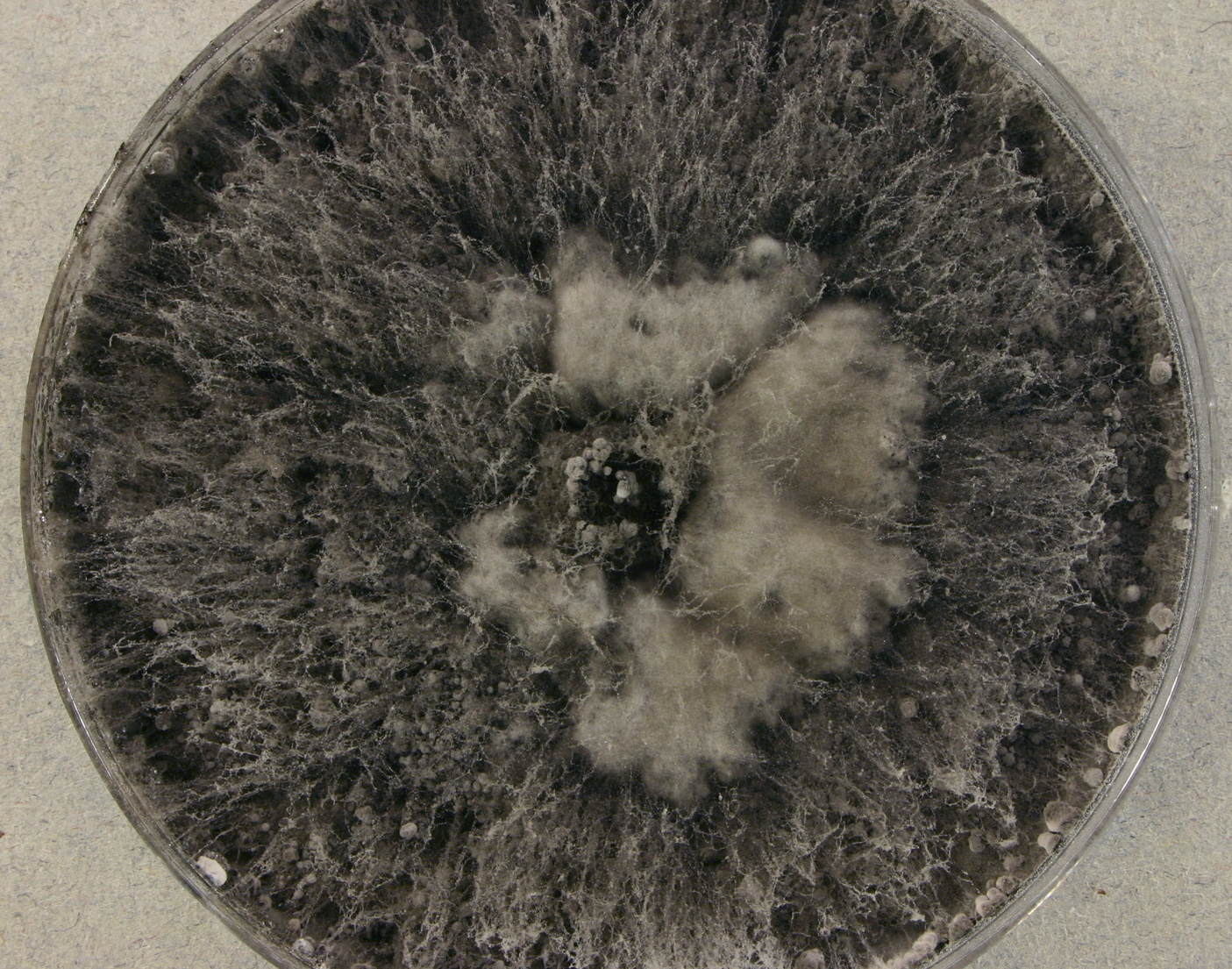
UAMH 10614 Neoscytalidium dimidiatum on CER agar incubated at 35 C for 29 days.

This filamentous fungus produces sinuous and irregular hyphae and is characterized by rapidly growing colonies that are deeply tufted with dense, darkly coloured, ropy aerial mycelium. Cultures are rapidly growing, initially light in colour and becoming dark brown and then black with age. Both arthroconidia and pycnidia may be produced in the same culture. Cultures of the fungus derived from human skin tend to be black in colouration.

== Habitat and ecology ==
Neoscytalidium dimidiatum is mainly found in tropical to subtropical environments, such as in South America, Southeast Asia, India and Africa. In addition to these regions, this fungus is endemic to parts of west and central Africa, the Caribbean and Asian, but more cases are being seen in temperate countries, possibly as a consequence of immigration from tropical regions. The fungus occurs in nature in soil and on decaying wood.

=== Human infection ===
Neoscytalidium dimidiatum has been described as an agent to cause infections referred to as dermatomycosis, onychomycosis, ringworm or tinea, affecting human nails, toe webs and feet, and skin, forming hyphomycete, and also sometimes infecting the palms of hands but this is a rare occurrence. To cause these infections in humans, infections occurs through contact with contaminated soil or plant materials, or nail or skin tissue from an infected person, causing superficial skin infections similar to dermatophytosis called Scytalidiosis. Although established to cause dermatomycosis and onychomycosis, invasive infection by N. dimidiatum is rare, resulting in limited case reports and limited information available for clinical progression and treatment. as well as there is no currently know oral or topical treatment for infection with this fungus. These result in the invasion of tissue and organs causing systemic diseases. Infection can occur in both immunocompetent and immunosuppressed patients, but deep infections occur mainly in immunosuppressed/ immunocompromised individuals with a 50% case mortality. Melanin is characteristically produced by the fungus in vivo in diseased human tissue where its presence has been interpreted as an important pathogenic factor. Although limited in case reports, there have been some reported cases of N. dimidiatum causing dermatomycosis or onychomycosis in places such as Jamaica, Brazil, Algeria, Canada, the United States and the United Kingdom. In addition, there have been some papers reporting infections besides dermatomycosis and onychomycosis, such as discovery of this fungus confirmed by DNA analysis to cause a fatal case of lung disease. Similarly, a case of lung infection has been reported in a dolphin. A case of rhinosinusitis, a disease where it is believed that fungi play a role in the disease process, was reported to have been caused by N. dimidiatum.

=== Plant disease ===
Neoscytalidium dimidiatum has been mainly described as an opportunistic plant pathogen, causing pit canker and spot on the stem of plants or fruits, as well as internal black rot of fruits, but a case of internal brown rot of Hylocereus undatus was reported from China. Similarly in Malaysia was a report of the fungus causing stem canker of Hylocereus polyrhizus, and a similar report of stem canker on grapevine in California.
