= Neoscytalidium =

Scientific classification
- Kingdom: Fungi
- Division: Ascomycota
- Class: Dothideomycetes
- Order: Botryosphaeriales
- Family: Botryosphaeriaceae
- Genus: Neoscytalidium; Crous & Slippers (2006)

Type species
- Neoscytalidium dimidiatum (Penz.) Crous & Slippers (2006)

Genus of fungi

Neoscytalidium is a genus of fungi in the Botryosphaeriaceae family.

== Species ==
As accepted by Species Fungorum;

- Neoscytalidium dimidiatum (Penz.) Crous & Slippers (2006)
- Neoscytalidium novaehollandiae Pavlic, T.I. Burgess & M.J. Wingf. (2008)
- Neoscytalidium oculi R.P. Calvillo-Medina, J. Mena, Raymundo & V. Bautista-de-Lucio (2018)
- Neoscytalidium orchidacearum S.K. Huang, Tangthir., J.C. Kang & K.D. Hyde (2016)

Former species;

- N. dimidiatum var. hyalinum (C.K. Campb. & J.L. Mulder) Madrid, Ruíz-Cendoya, Cano, Stchigel, Orofino & Guarro (2009) = Neoscytalidium dimidiatum
- N. hyalinum (C.K. Campb. & J.L. Mulder) A.J.L. Phillips, M. Groenew. & Crous (2013) = Neoscytalidium dimidiatum
