= Onycholysis =

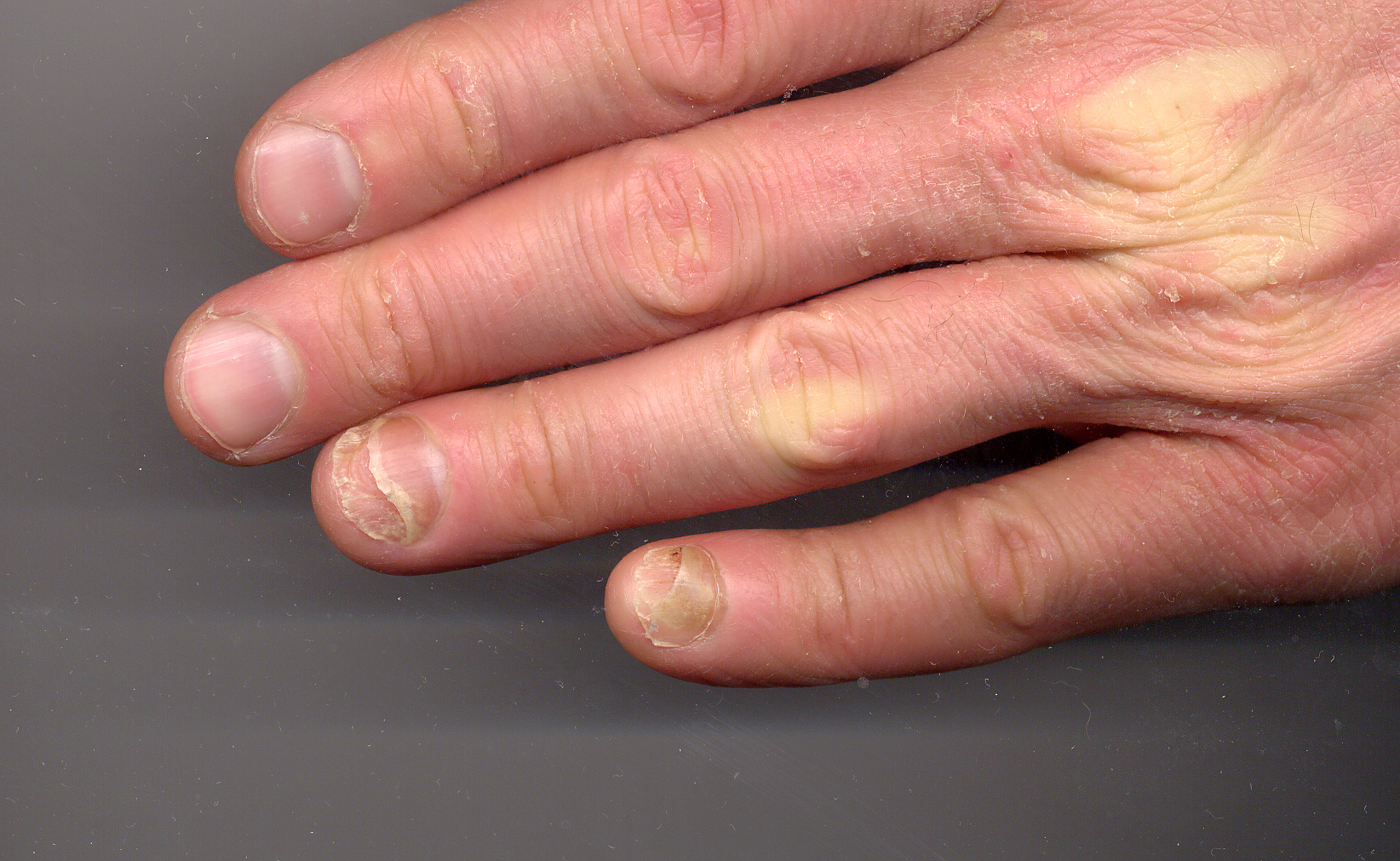
- Left hand onycholysis: ring and little fingers affected
- Pronunciation: /ˌɒnɪˈkɒlɪsɪs/
- Specialty: Dermatology

Onycholysis is a common medical condition characterized by the painless detachment of the nail from the nail bed, usually starting at the tip and/or sides. On the hands, it occurs particularly on the ring finger but can occur on any of the fingernails. It may also happen to toenails.

Onycholysis can occur in many conditions, including psoriasis. In thyrotoxicosis, it is thought to be due to sympathetic overactivity. It may also be seen in infections or trauma.

== Causes ==
- Unknown
- Trauma, excessive manicuring
- Infection: especially fungal
- Skin disease: psoriasis, dermatitis
- Impaired peripheral circulation, e.g. Raynaud's syndrome
- Systemic disease: hyperthyroidism, hypothyroidism, reactive arthritis, porphyria cutanea tarda
- Reaction to detergents (e.g. washing dishes with bare hands, using detergent-based shampoos or soaps).
- Patients with hepatocellular dysfunction may develop hair-thinning or hair loss and nail changes such as clubbing, leukonychia (whitening), or onycholysis, affecting the nails of the hands and feet.
- Onychomycosis (tinea)
- It is common in ballet dancers
- Chemotherapy (cytotoxic agents like taxanes, vinca alkaloids and others)
- Chronic Renal Failure

== Treatment ==
Most instances of onycholysis without a clear cause will heal spontaneously within a few weeks. The most commonly recommended treatment is to keep the nail dry as much as possible and allow the nail to slowly reattach. Trimming away as much loose nail as can be done comfortably will prevent the nail from being pried upwards. Cleaning under the nail is not recommended as this only serves to separate the nail further. Bandages are also to be avoided. When kept dry and away from further trauma, the nail will reattach from the base upward (i.e., from proximal to distal). The aim of treatment is also to eliminate onychomycosis that is a major cause of onycholysis. Antifungals like terbinafin and itraconazole in the form of oral pills should be given for 6 to 8 weeks.

If the underlying cause of the condition is not found and the nail continues to detach despite conservative treatment, the nail bed may begin to form a granular layer of abnormal cells on its surface. After six months of detachment, this layer is likely to prevent the adhesion of any new nail tissue, possibly leading to permanent deformity.

== Etymology ==
The word onycholysis comes from onycho-, from Ancient Greek ὄνυξ ónuks 'nail', and Ancient Greek λύσις lúsis 'lysis/disintegration'.

== See also ==
- List of cutaneous conditions
