= Anti-seborrheic =

Drug or agent applied to the skin to control seborrhea or seborrheic dermatitis

Anti-seborrheics are drugs effective in seborrheic dermatitis. Selenium sulfide, zinc pyrithione, corticosteroids, imidazole antifungals, and salicylic acid are common anti-seborrheics.

== Ideal anti-seborrheic ==
An ideal antiseborrheic should have the following qualities:

- It should be non-toxic.
- It should relieve pruritus.
- It should not cause excessive dryness.
- It should have a wide antibacterial and antifungal spectrum.

== Specific anti-seborrheic agents ==
=== Selenium sulfide ===
Selenium sulfide slows down epidermal proliferation. It is fungicidal to Pityrosporum ovale. It also acts as a keratolytic. Selenium sulfide is also known to reduce dryness of scalp and folliculitis. Systemic toxicity can appear if it is applied to inflamed skin. Hypersensitivity reactions are noted in some people.

=== Zinc pyrithione ===
Like selenium sulfide, zinc pyrithione (a zinc complex with two chelating pyrithione anions) also reduces epidermal turnover and inhibits fungal growth. It is often administered with ketoconazole for better results. The symptoms do not resolve completely even after prolonged medication.

=== Corticosteroids ===
Topical steroids are used to relieve the symptoms of seborrheic dermatitis. It has a fungicidal action, and reduces dandruff. The disadvantage is that it has a high relapse rate on discontinuation. Prolonged use can cause poor healing of wounds.

=== Imidazole antifungals ===
Only a few imidazole antifungals are effective against seborrheic dermatitis. Ketoconazole was found to be the most active against Pityrosporum ovale. It is available in both oral and topical formulations. It is also available as cream, gel and tablet. Unlike other drugs, it does not cause skin irritation or phototoxicity. Clotrimazole is also used in treating seborrhoea.

=== Other drugs ===
Other drugs like sulfur and resorcinol have also been found useful in treating seborrheic dermatitis. These drugs have keratolytic and antiseptic properties which may benefit seborrhoea. Salicylic acid has a mild effect on seborrhoea.
