= Cradle cap =

Crusting or scaling of a baby's scalp

- Other names: infantile or neonatal seborrhoeic dermatitis, crusta lactea, milk crust, honeycomb disease, scurf cap
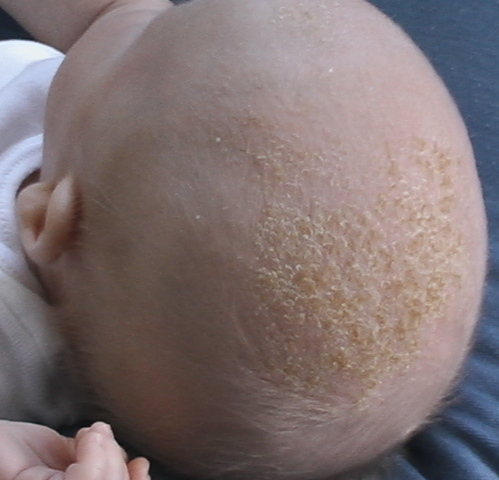
- An infant with characteristic scaly scalp of cradle cap
- Specialty: Dermatology

Cradle cap is crusty or oily scaly patches on a baby's scalp. The condition is not painful or itchy, but it can cause thick white or yellow scales that are not easy to remove.

Cradle cap most commonly begins sometime in the first three months but can occur in later years. Similar symptoms in older children are more likely to be dandruff than cradle cap. The rash is often prominent around the ear, the eyebrows or the eyelids. It may appear in other locations as well, where it is called infantile seborrhoeic dermatitis. Cradle cap is just a special—and more benign—case of this condition. The exact cause of cradle cap is not known. Cradle cap is not spread from person to person (not contagious). It is also not caused by poor hygiene. It is not an allergy, and it is not dangerous. Cradle cap often lasts a few months. In some children, the condition can last until age 2 or 3.

== Signs and symptoms ==
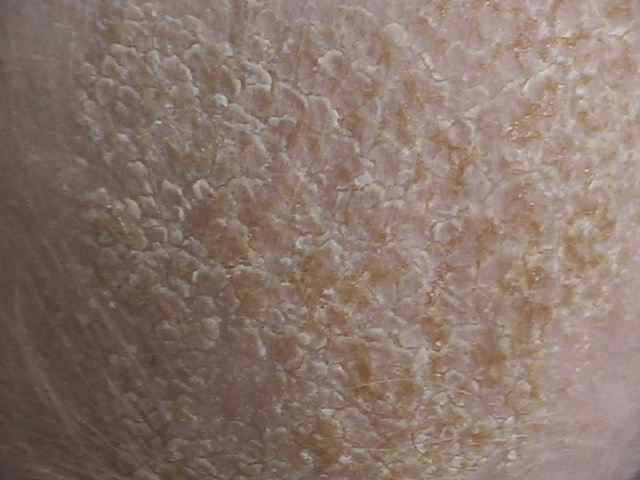
Close up image of cradle cap

Cradle cap is seborrheic dermatitis that affects infants. It presents on the scalp as greasy patches of scaling, which appear thick, crusty, yellow, white or brown. The affected regions are not usually itchy and do not bother the child. Other affected areas can include the eyelids, ear, around the nose, and in the groin. Hair loss can also occur.

== Causes ==
Cradle cap is not caused by bacterial infection, allergy or poor hygiene. Cradle cap is also not contagious. Doctors do not agree on what causes cradle cap, but the two most common hypotheses are fungal infection and overactive sebaceous glands. Cradle cap is an inflammatory condition.

Possibly it has to do with overactive sebaceous glands in the skin of newborn babies, due to the mother's hormones still in the baby's circulation. The glands release a greasy substance that makes old skin cells attach to the scalp instead of falling off as they dry. There is a relationship with skin yeasts (Malassezia furfur).

== Warning signs ==
If the condition thickens, turns red and irritated, starts spreading, appears on other body parts, or if the baby develops thrush (fungal mouth infection), fungal ear infection (an ear infection that does not respond to antibiotics) or a persistent diaper rash, medical intervention is recommended.

Severe cases of cradle cap, especially with cracked or bleeding skin, can provide a place for bacteria to grow. If the cradle cap is caused by a fungal infection which has worsened significantly over days or weeks to allow bacterial growth (impetigo, most commonly), a combination treatment of antibiotics and antifungals may be necessary. Since it is difficult for a layperson to distinguish the difference between sebaceous gland cradle cap, fungal cradle cap, or either of these combined with a bacterial infection, medical advice should be sought if the condition appears to worsen.

Cradle cap is occasionally linked to immune disorders. If the baby is not thriving and has other problems (e.g. diarrhea), a doctor should be consulted.

== Treatment ==
To help with cradle cap, parents can gently massage their baby's scalp with their fingers or a soft brush to loosen the scales. They may want to shampoo the baby's hair more frequently (no more than once a day), and after shampooing gently brush the baby's scalp with a soft brush or a terrycloth towel. Oil remedies can be used by rubbing a small amount of pure, plant-derived oil (coconut oil, olive oil, almond oil) on the baby's scalp and leaving it on for 15 minutes. After 15 minutes, gently comb out the flakes with a fine tooth comb or brush. Be sure to wash out all of the oil to avoid making the cradle cap worse.

In cases that are related to fungal infection, such as tinea capitis, doctors may recommend a treatment application of clotrimazole (commonly prescribed for jock itch or athlete's foot) or miconazole (commonly prescribed for vaginal candidiasis).

Doctors may recommend a treatment with a mild dandruff shampoo such as Selsun Blue even though the treatment may cause initial additional scalp irritation. A doctor may instead prescribe an antifungal soap such as ketoconazole (2%) shampoo, which can work in a single treatment and shows significantly less irritation than over-the-counter shampoos such as selenium disulfide shampoos.

There are only a limited number of studies regarding the efficacy and safety of treatments for cradle cap and infantile seborrheic dermatitis. Several treatments including Promiseb, lactamide MEA gel, hydrocortisone 1% lotion, licochalcone 0.025%, flumethasone pivalate 0.02% ointment, and eosin 2% aqueous solution have been studied, however there is uncertainty regarding the efficacy and safety of these treatments.

For adults: see the article on seborrheic dermatitis (the adult version of cradle cap).

=== Scalp, behind ears, eyebrows ===
If the cradle cap is not severe, it could simply be combed out gently after bathing. The softened scales can then be brushed away with a soft brush, comb or cloth, but if not done very gently, this could worsen the condition and bring about temporary hair loss. Applying petroleum jelly (e.g., Vaseline) liberally overnight is another popular treatment. The softened scales either fall off during the night, or can be brushed off in the morning.

There is broad disagreement regarding the role of shampoos. Some sources warn against frequent shampooing, others recommend it. Mild baby shampoo is often recommended, but the exact denotation of the label "mild" in this context is not quite clear. Baby shampoos often contain detergent surfactants, perfumes, quaternium-15 and other eczematogenic irritants. No studies have been performed on non-prescription shampoos.

In stubborn cases some doctors may recommend keratolytic (dandruff) shampoos (e.g. with sulfur, selenium, zinc pyrithione, or salicylic acid) while others warn against the use of medicated shampoos in newborns due to systemic absorption. Dandruff shampoos often contain sodium dodecyl sulfate, a noted skin irritant.

Steroid and tar preparations have also been used but may have drawbacks. The immunomodulators tacrolimus/Protopic and pimecrolimus/Elidel have not been approved for children under two years.

Ketoconazole shampoos and creams are currently shown to be the most effective medical treatment of moderate to serious cradle cap. There appears to be little to no absorption of topical ketoconazole into the bloodstream.

=== Eyelids ===
Typical medical advice is to use baby shampoo, diluted with warm water, on a cotton swab to cleanse the eyelid. There is no agreement on the dilution, which ranges from as high as a 1:1 mix to as low as a few drops of shampoo per half-cup of water.

== Prognosis/differential diagnosis ==
Assurances that this condition will clear as the baby matures are very common. However, the condition occasionally persists into the toddler years, and less commonly into later childhood. It tends to recur in adolescence and persists into adulthood. In an Australian study, about 15 percent of previously diagnosed children still had eczema 10 years later. It is common that people mistake cradle cap for atopic dermatitis due to the similar symptoms. Unlike some signs and symptoms of cradle cap, atopic dermatitis affect infants' sleep and feeding habits with moderate to severe itching. In addition, one of the physical diagnosis of atopic dermatitis is poor crusted lesions on certain surfaces of the baby, such as scalp and cheek. Rarely, it turns out to be misdiagnosed psoriasis.
