= Rash =

Change of the skin that affects its color, appearance, or texture

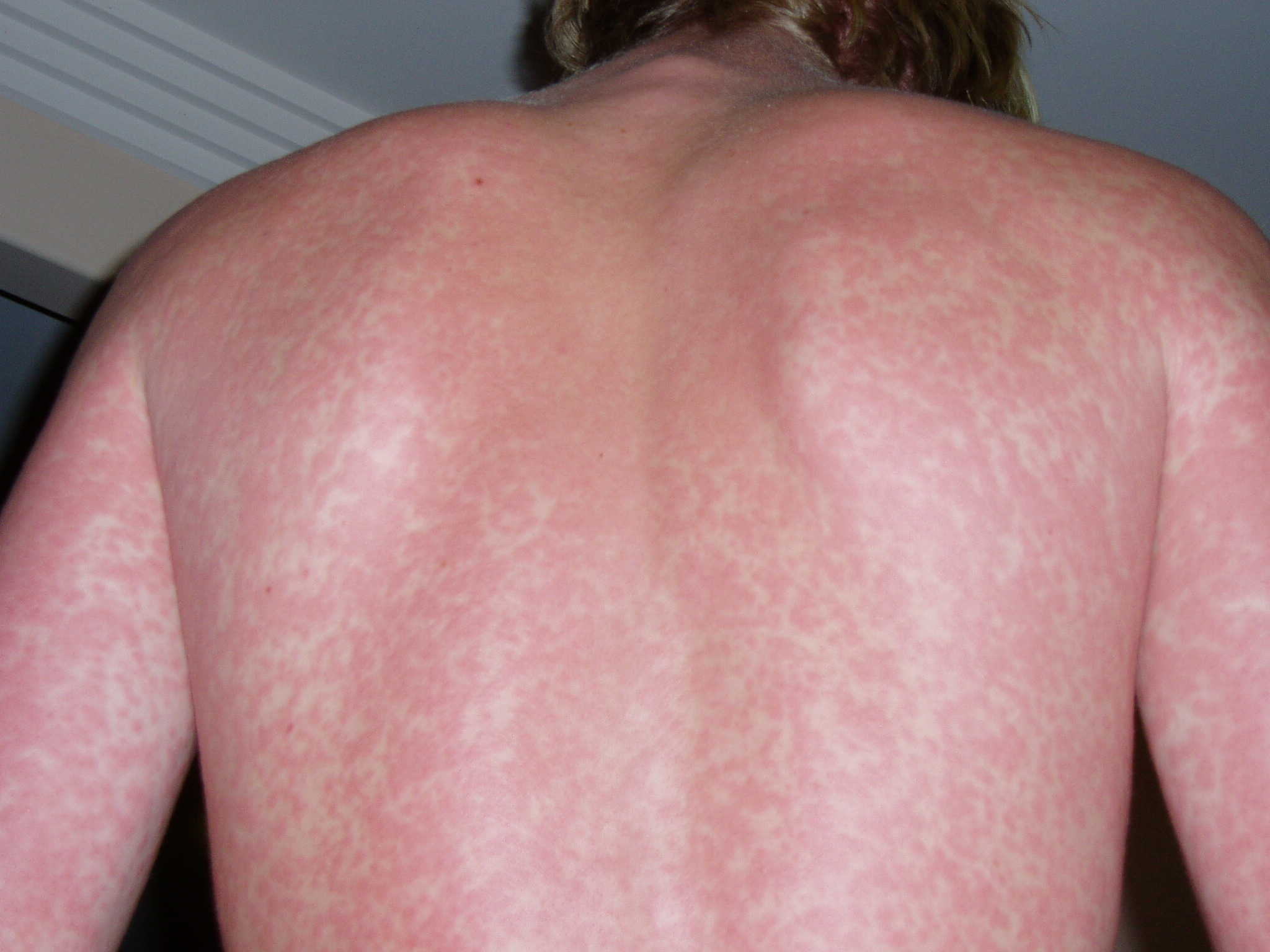
- A diffuse rash on the back of a human
- Specialty: Dermatology

A rash is a change of the skin that affects its color, appearance, or texture.

A rash may be localized in one part of the body, or affect all the skin. Rashes may cause the skin to change color, itch, become warm, bumpy, chapped, dry, cracked or blistered, swell, and may be painful. The causes, and therefore treatments for rashes, vary widely. Diagnosis must take into account such things as the appearance of the rash, other symptoms, what the patient may have been exposed to, occupation, and occurrence in family members. The diagnosis may confirm any number of conditions. The presence of a rash may aid diagnosis; associated signs and symptoms are diagnostic of certain diseases. For example, the rash in measles is an erythematous, morbilliform, maculopapular rash that begins a few days after the fever starts. It classically starts at the head, and spreads downwards.

== Differential diagnosis ==
Common causes of rashes include:

- Food allergy
- Medication side effects
- Anxiety
- Skin contact with an irritant
  - Fungal infection, such as ringworm
  - Balsam of Peru
- Skin diseases such as eczema or acne
- Exposure to sun or heat
- Friction due to chafing of the skin
- Secondary syphilis
- Poor personal hygiene

Uncommon causes:

- Autoimmune disorders such as psoriasis
- Lead poisoning
- Pregnancy
- Repeated scratching on a particular spot
- Lyme disease
- Scarlet fever
- COVID-19 (see Symptoms of COVID-19 § Other)

=== Conditions ===
Skin disease	Symptoms	Usual area of body
Acne vulgaris	Comedones, papules, pustules and nodules.	Face, chest and back.
Acne rosacea	Flushed appearance or redness.	Cheeks, chin, forehead or nose.
Boil	Painful red bump or a cluster of painful red bumps	Anywhere
Cellulitis	Red, tender and swollen areas of skin	Around a cut, scrape or skin breach
Insect bite	Red and/or itchy bumps on the skin	Anywhere and can be sprinkled randomly
Erythema migrans / Lyme disease	Expands over days or weeks to 5–70 cm (median 16 cm), circular or oval, red or bluish, may have an elevated or darker center, may have a central or ring-like clearing, may feel warm, not painful or itchy	Armpit, groin, back of knee, on the trunk, under clothing straps, or in children's hair, ear, or neck
Allergic reaction	Irregular, raised or flat red sores that appeared after taking medicine/drugs or eating certain foods	Anywhere
Hidradenitis Suppurativa	Deep sebum filled cystic condition of apocrine gland overstimulation, caused by many internal and external factors e.g., stress, toxic environmental overload and immune impairment.	See Hidradenitis.
Hives	Bumps formed suddenly	Anywhere but usually first noticed on face
Seborrheic dermatitis	Bumps and swelling	Near glands
Cradle cap	Dry, scaly skin	Scalp of recently born babies
Irritant contact dermatitis	Red, itchy, scaly, or oily rash	Eyebrows, nose, edge of the scalp, point of contact with jewellery, perfume, or clothing.
Allergic Contact Dermatitis caused by poison ivy, poison oak, sumac, or Balsam of Peru	Red, itchy, scaly or oily rash; can also be weeping or leathery.	Anywhere that came in contact with the irritant either directly or via transfer (e.g. from contaminated clothing.)
Allergic purpura	Small red dots on the skin, or larger, bruise-like spots that appeared after taking medicine	Anywhere
Pityriasis Rosea	Started with a single scaly, red and slightly itchy spot, and within a few days, did large numbers of smaller patches of the rash, some red and/or others tan	Chest and abdomen
Dermatitis herpetiformis	Intensely itchy rash with red bumps and blisters	Elbows, knees, back or buttocks
Erythema nodosum	Large red bumps that seem to bruise and are tender to touch	Anywhere
Psoriasis	White, scaly rash over red, flaky, irritated skin	Elbows and knees
Erythema multiforme	Red, blotchy rash, with "target like" hives or sores.	Anywhere
Measles	Red rash that is raised with a fever or sore throat.	Usually starts first on the forehead and face and spreads downward.
Chickenpox	Multiple blisters with a fever, cough, aches, tiredness and sore throat.	Usually starts first on the face, chest and back and spreads downward.
Shingles	Red blisters that are very painful and may crust	Anywhere
Fifth Disease	Started as a fever and then developed a bright red rash	Cheeks
Warts	Soft bumps forming that do not itch and have no other symptoms	Anywhere
Ringworm	Bald spot on the scalp or a ring of itchy red skin	Anywhere
Syphilis	Rash that is red but not itchy	Palms of hands or soles of feet
Jock itch, yeast infection or diaper rash	Red itchy rash	Groin
Tinea versicolor	Light coloured patches	Anywhere
Impetigo	Crusted, tan-colored sores	Near nose or lip
Scabies	Bite-like sores that itch and spread intensely	Usually start on hands or feet and spread everywhere
Rocky Mountain spotted fever	A fine rash with a fever and headache	Usually start on arms and legs including the hands and feet
Lupus erythematosus	A butterfly rash with achy joints	Forehead and cheeks
Jaundice or sign of hepatitis	Yellowish	Skin, whites of eyes and mouth
Bruise	Blue or black area after being hit	Anywhere
Actinic keratoses	Scaly, pink, gray or tan patches or bumps	Face, scalp or on the backs or the hands
Keloid or hypertrophic scar	Scar that has grown larger than expected	Anywhere
Lipoma	Soft or rubbery growth	Anywhere
Milia	Many white spots	On the face of a baby
Molluscum contagiosum	Small, firm, round bumps with pits in the center that may sit on tiny stalks	Anywhere
Scarlet fever	Becomes confluent and forms bright red lines in the skin creases of the neck, armpits and groins (Pastia's lines)	Face, chest and back, whole body, armpits, inside elbows, groins
Sebaceous cyst	Bump with a white dome under the skin	Scalp, nape of the neck or upper back
Skin tag	Soft, fleshy growth, lump or bump	Face, neck, armpits or groin
Xanthelasma	Yellow area under the skin	Under eyelids
Melanoma	Dark bump that may have started within a mole or blemish, or, a spot or mole that has changed in color, size, shape or is painful or itchy	Anywhere
Basal cell carcinoma	Fleshy, growing mass	Areas exposed to the sun
Squamous cell carcinoma	Unusual growth that is red, scaly or crusted	Face, lip or chin
Kaposi's sarcoma	Dark or black raised spots on the skin that keep growing or have appeared recently	Anywhere
Erythema annulare centrifugum (EAC)	Pink-red ring or bullseye marks	Anywhere

== Diagnostic approach ==
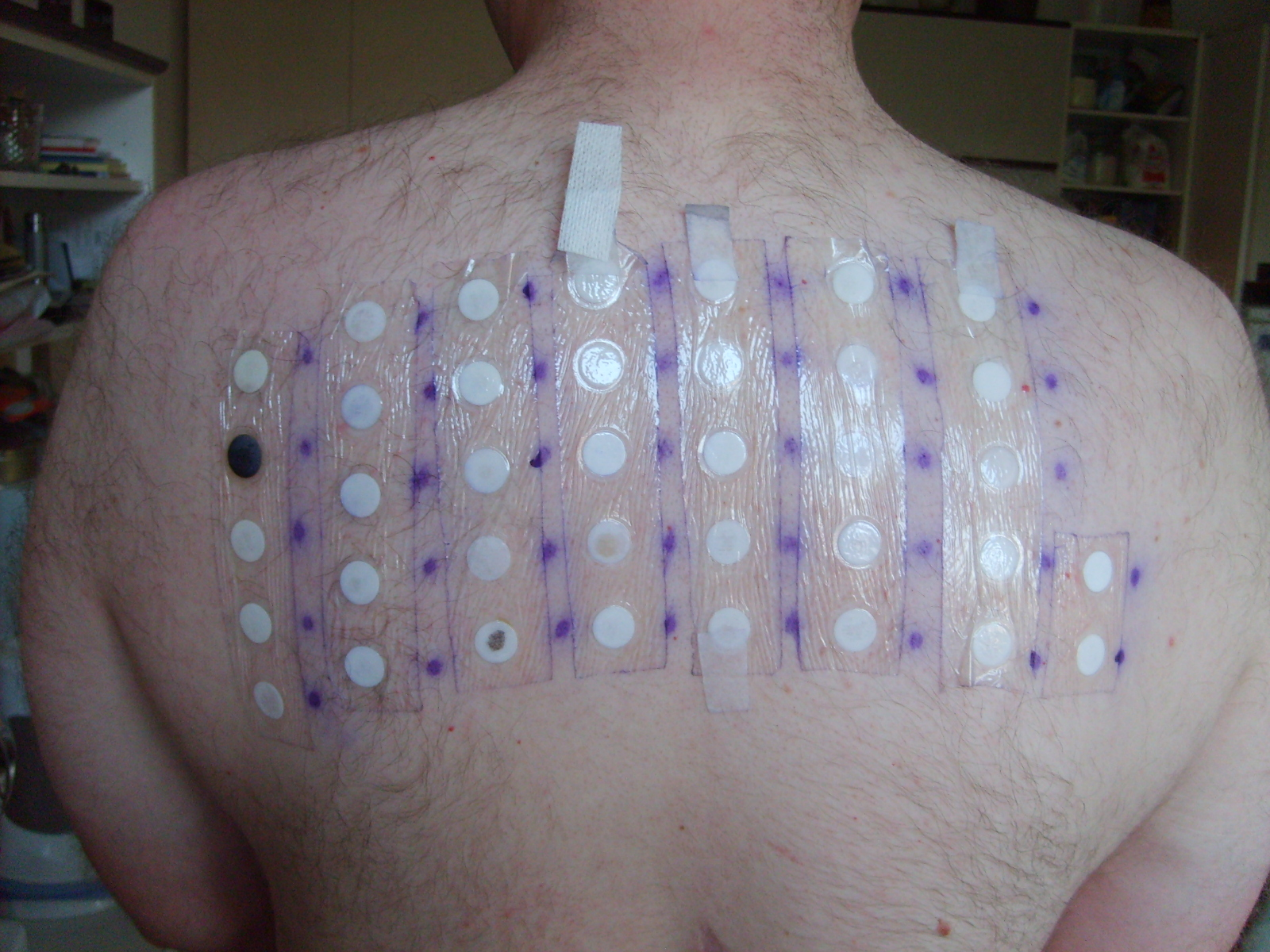
Patch test for identifying possible allergens

The causes of a rash are numerous, which may make the evaluation of a rash extremely difficult. An accurate evaluation by a provider may only be made in the context of a thorough history, i.e. medications the patient is taking, the patient's occupation, where the patient has been and complete physical examination.

Points typically noted in the examination include:

- The appearance: e.g., purpuric (typical of vasculitis and meningococcal disease), fine and like sandpaper (typical of scarlet fever); circular lesions with a central depression are typical of molluscum contagiosum (and in the past, small pox); plaques with silver scales are typical of psoriasis.
- The distribution: e.g., the rash of scarlet fever becomes confluent and forms bright red lines in the skin creases of the neck, armpits and groins (Pastia's lines); the vesicles of chicken pox seem to follow the hollows of the body (they are more prominent along the depression of the spine on the back and in the hollows of both shoulder blades); very few rashes affect the palms of the hands and soles of the feet (secondary syphilis, rickettsia or spotted fevers, guttate psoriasis, hand, foot and mouth disease, keratoderma blennorrhagicum);
- Symmetry: e.g., herpes zoster usually only affects one side of the body and does not cross the midline.

A patch test may be ordered, for diagnostic purposes.

== Treatment ==
Treatment differs according to which rash a patient has been diagnosed with. Common rashes can be easily remedied using steroid topical creams (such as hydrocortisone and betamethasone) or non-steroidal treatments (such as salicylic acid, sulfur, tea tree oil, benzoic acid, zinc oxide, selenium sulfide, piroctone olamine, clotrimazole and miconazole). Many of the medications are available over the counter in the United States.

The problem with steroid topical creams i.e. hydrocortisone; is their inability to penetrate the skin through absorption and therefore not be effective in clearing up the affected area, thus rendering the hydrocortisone almost completely ineffective in all except the most mild of cases.
