= Head & Shoulders =

Shampoo brand by Procter & Gamble

- Product type: Anti-dandruff, non-dandruff shampoo
- Current owner: Procter & Gamble
- Produced by: Procter & Gamble
- Country: United States
- Introduced: 1 January 1961; 65 years ago
- Markets: Worldwide
- Previous owners: Richardson Vicks
- Website: Official Website (USA)

Head & Shoulders (H&S) is an American brand of anti-dandruff and non-dandruff shampoo produced by parent company Procter & Gamble.

The active anti-fungal ingredient in Head & Shoulders is piroctone olamine or zinc pyrithione, with some "clinical strength" varieties also containing selenium disulfide.

== History ==
Procter & Gamble began researching improved treatments for dandruff around 1950. After approximately ten years of research, its scientists developed a shampoo using zinc pyrithione, and Head & Shoulders was introduced in the United States in 1961.

The development of zinc-pyrithione anti-dandruff shampoos was the subject of a patent application assigned jointly to P&G and R. T. Vanderbilt Company covering methods of treating dandruff with detergent and shampoo compositions containing pyrithione metal salts, including zinc pyrithione, which was issued in 1966. The patent derived from a series of applications extending back to 1958. P&G applied for trademark registration for the name Head & Shoulders in 1961, and the mark was registered in 1962.

The brand subsequently expanded internationally. In 1988, Head & Shoulders became the first P&G brand launched in mainland China. P&G later developed combination shampoo-and-conditioner products under the Head & Shoulders brand.

Head & Shoulders remained commercially prominent decades after its introduction. In 1982 it was noted that "no one hair care brand gets so many ad dollars as Head & Shoulders", and that "no other brand matches its sales", despite it being a "medicated" shampoo. In 2011, marking the brand's 50th anniversary, The Guardian reported that it was the world's largest-selling shampoo brand, selling approximately 29 million units annually.

== Marketing ==
Advertising for Head & Shoulders has frequently associated dandruff with concerns regarding personal appearance and social embarrassment. One of its longest-running campaigns has marketed the product under the tagline "You Never Get a Second Chance to Make a First Impression", which has been identified as an example of "anxiety marketing" commonly used by Procter & Gamble to drive sales by inducing fears of social consequences associated with the condition that the product claims to address. Advertising has also sought to distance Head & Shoulders from its early image as a purely medicinal treatment, and to reduce perceived stigma associated with using an anti-dandruff shampoo.
