= Climbazole =

Chemical compound

Clinical data
- Routes of administration: topical
- ATC code: none

Identifiers
- IUPAC name: (RS)-1-(4-Chlorophenoxy)-1-imidazol-1-yl-3,3-dimethylbutan-2-one
- CAS Number: 38083-17-9
- PubChem CID: 37907
- ChemSpider: 34752
- UNII: 9N42CW7I54
- ChEBI: CHEBI:83499
- ChEMBL: ChEMBL1437764
- CompTox Dashboard (EPA): DTXSID6046555
- ECHA InfoCard: 100.048.870

Chemical and physical data
- Formula: C_{15}H_{17}ClN_{2}O_{2}
- Molar mass: 292.76 g·mol^{−1}
- 3D model (JSmol): Interactive image
- Chirality: Racemic mixture
- SMILES: CC(C)(C)C(=O)C(n1ccnc1)Oc2ccc(cc2)Cl
- InChI: InChI=1S/C15H17ClN2O2/c1-15(2,3)13(19)14(18-9-8-17-10-18)20-12-6-4-11(16)5-7-12/h4-10,14H,1-3H3; Key:OWEGWHBOCFMBLP-UHFFFAOYSA-N

Climbazole is a topical antifungal agent commonly used in the treatment of human fungal skin infections such as dandruff, seborrhoeic dermatitis and eczema. Climbazole has shown a high in vitro and in vivo efficacy against Malassezia spp. that appear to play an important role in the pathogenesis of dandruff. Its chemical structure and properties are similar to other azole fungicides such as ketoconazole, clotrimazole and miconazole.

== Indications and formulations ==
It is most commonly found as an active ingredient in OTC anti-dandruff and anti-fungal products, including shampoos, lotions and conditioners. It may be accompanied by other active ingredients such as zinc pyrithione or triclosan.

== Side effects ==
It may cause localized irritation of the skin with symptoms including redness, rashes and itching.

== See also ==
- Ketoconazole
