= ZPT =

ZPT may refer to:

- Zero Point Technologies LLC
- Zope page templates
- Zinc pyrithione
