= Seborrheic-like psoriasis =

- Other names: Sebopsoriasis, and Seborrhiasis
- Specialty: Dermatology

Seborrheic-like psoriasis is a skin condition characterized by psoriasis with an overlapping seborrheic dermatitis.

== See also ==
- Psoriasis
- Skin lesion
- List of cutaneous conditions
