= Zinc pyrithione =

Chemical compound

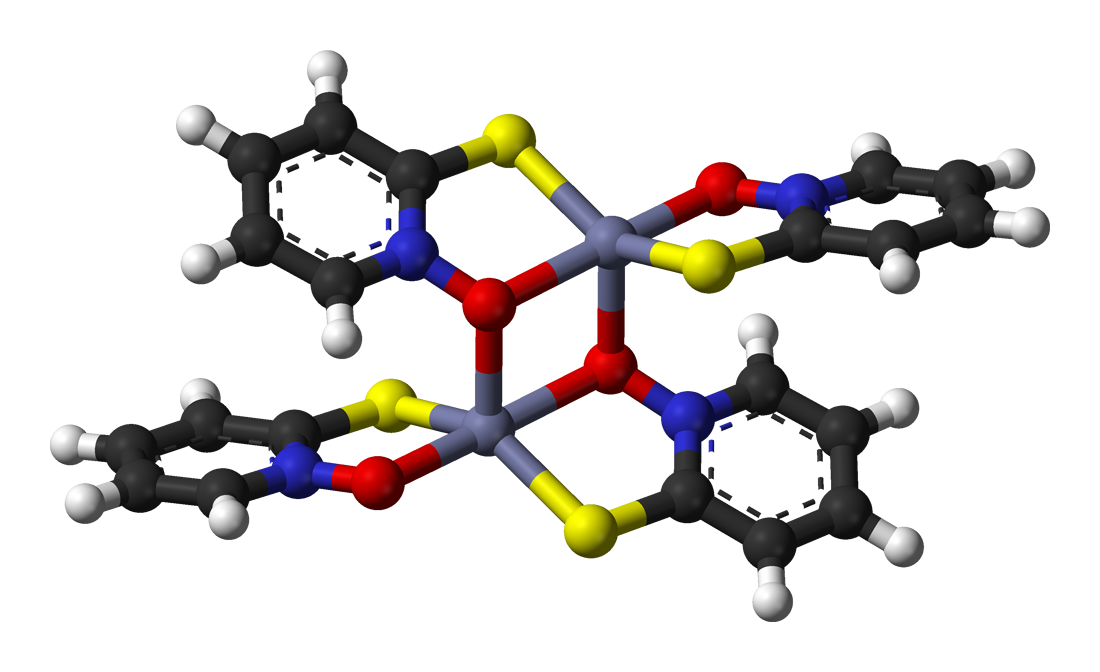
- Zinc pyrithione dimer

Names
- IUPAC name bis(2-pyridylthio)zinc 1,1'-dioxide
- Other names ZnP, Pyrithione Zinc, Zinc OMADINE, ZnPT, ZPT

Identifiers
CAS Number	13463-41-7
3D model (JSmol)	monomer: Interactive image; dimer: Interactive image
ChEMBL	ChEMBL1200471
ChemSpider	21513957
ECHA InfoCard	100.033.324
PubChem CID	3005837
UNII	R953O2RHZ5
CompTox Dashboard (EPA)	DTXSID7026314
- InChI: InChI=1/C5H5NOS.Zn/c7-6-4-2-1-3-5(6)8;/h1-4,7H;/q;+2 Key: YUYSACQNSLQTMI-UHFFFAOYAS
- SMILES: monomer: c1cc[n+]2c(c1)S[Zn-2]3(O2)O[n+]4ccccc4S3; dimer: [O+]01[n+]2ccccc2S[Zn-3]03(O[n+]4ccccc4S3)[O+]5[n+]6ccccc6S[Zn-3]157O[n+]8ccccc8S7

Properties
Chemical formula	C_{10}H_{8}N_{2}O_{2}S_{2}Zn
Molar mass	317.70 g/mol
Appearance	colourless solid
Melting point	240 °C (464 °F; 513 K) (decomposition)
Boiling point	decomposes
Solubility in water	8 ppm (pH 7)

Pharmacology
ATC code	D11AX12 (WHO)
- Except where otherwise noted, data are given for materials in their standard state (at 25 °C [77 °F], 100 kPa). verify (what is ?) Infobox references

Zinc pyrithione (or pyrithione zinc) is a coordination complex of zinc. It has fungistatic (inhibiting the division of fungal cells) and bacteriostatic (inhibiting bacterial cell division) properties and is used in the treatment of seborrhoeic dermatitis and dandruff.

== Structure of the compound ==
The pyrithione ligands, which are formally monoanions, are chelated to Zn^{2+} via oxygen and sulfur centers. In the crystalline state, zinc pyrithione exists as a centrosymmetric dimer (see figure), where each zinc is bonded to two sulfur and three oxygen centers. In solution, however, the dimers dissociate via scission of one Zn-O bond.

This compound was first described in the 1930s.

Pyrithione is the conjugate base derived from 2-mercaptopyridine-N-oxide (CAS# 1121-31-9), a derivative of pyridine-N-oxide.

== Uses ==
=== Medicine ===
Zinc pyrithione can be used to treat dandruff and seborrhoeic dermatitis. It also has antibacterial properties and is effective against many pathogens from the Streptococcus and Staphylococcus genera. Its other medical applications include treatments of psoriasis, eczema, ringworm, athletes foot, dry skin, atopic dermatitis, tinea versicolor, and vitiligo.

=== Paint ===
Because of its low solubility in water (8 ppm at neutral pH), zinc pyrithione is suitable for use in outdoor paints and other products that protect against mildew and algae. It is an algaecide. It is chemically incompatible with paints relying on metal carboxylate curing agents. When it is used in latex paints with water containing much iron, a sequestering agent that preferentially binds the iron ions is needed. It is decomposed by ultraviolet light slowly, providing years of protection in direct sunlight.

=== Sponges ===
Zinc pyrithione is an antibacterial treatment for household sponges, as used by the 3M Corporation.

=== Clothing ===
A process to apply zinc pyrithione to cotton with washable results was patented in the United States in 1984. Zinc pyrithione is used to prevent microbe growth in polyester. Textiles with applied zinc pyrithione protect against odor-causing microorganisms. Export of antimicrobial textiles reached US$497.4 million in 2015.

== Mechanism of action ==
=== Antibacterial effect ===
Zinc pyrithione is known to exhibit antibacterial activity by disrupting cell membrane integrity and essential metabolic functions in bacteria.

=== Antifungal effect ===
Its antifungal effect is thought to derive from its ability to disrupt membrane transport by blocking the proton pump that energizes the transport mechanism. A study from 2011 showed that antifungal effects of zinc pyrithione work by copper toxicity mechanism that targets critical iron–sulphur proteins.

== Health effects ==
Zinc pyrithione is approved for over-the-counter topical use in the United States as a treatment for dandruff and is the active ingredient in several anti-dandruff shampoos and body wash gels. In its industrial forms and strengths, it may be harmful by contact or ingestion. Zinc pyrithione can in the laboratory setting trigger a variety of responses, such as DNA damage in skin cells.

Zinc pyrithione is classified as a CMR Category 1B reproductive toxicant in the European Union, leading to its prohibition or strict limitation in certain products within that jurisdiction. Research suggests the substance may induce oxidative stress, which has been associated in some studies with physiological changes in the male reproductive system, such as alterations to sperm quality and hormone levels.

== Legal status ==
=== European Union ===
Use of zinc pyrithione is prohibited within cosmetic products in the European Union since December 2021. The substance was considered safe for use in rinse-off and leave-in products of different tested concentrations, but due to potential environmental toxicity consideration of the use of zinc pyrithione was made against potential alternative substance ingredients. Due to no industry submission to the regulators supporting the continued use of zinc pyrithione and/or an absence of indications that there were no suitable alternatives to the substance: the use of zinc pyrithione became automatically prohibited within cosmetic products as an intended ingredient. This was as a consequence of zinc pyrithione addition to the Cosmetic Product Regulation (EC) No 1223/2009 Annex II list.

=== United States ===
Zinc pyrithione concentration of up to 2% is allowed for products when they are formulated to be applied and then washed off after brief exposure. Alternatively, up to 0.25 percent when formulated to be left on the skin or scalp

== Environmental concerns ==
A large Swedish study shows that it is broken down in wastewater plants and does not release into waterways. A Danish study shows that it biodegrades quickly, but that a risk of continuous leaching from boat paint may cause environmental toxicity.

== Research ==
Zinc pyrithione is believed to have antiviral activity by acting as a zinc ionophore, facilitating the transport of zinc cations across cellular membranes and into the cytoplasm. This increase in intracellular zinc levels has been shown to suppress viral replication within in vitro cell culture models across several viral families (including coronaviruses, coxsackieviruses, and rhinoviruses) by interfering with RNA-dependent RNA polymerase (RdRp) activity, inhibiting RNA synthesis, and disrupting the proteolytic processing of viral nonstructural polyproteins. Beyond these effects, it appears to inhibit the expression of essential genes in certain viruses in vitro, specifically the immediate early gene ICP4 and the late gene glycoprotein D (gD), effectively halting the viral life cycle at multiple stages. Zinc pyrithione also influences the cellular ubiquitin-proteasome system (UPS) to degrade IκBα, which prevents the activation of NF-κB, a signaling pathway that viruses like herpes simplex virus typically exploit to facilitate their own replication within the host cell.

== See also ==
- Ketoconazole, another antifungal agent used in shampoos
- Piroctone olamine, another antifungal agent used in shampoos
- Selenium disulfide, an active ingredient used in shampoos such as Selsun Blue
