= Piroctone olamine =

Names
- IUPAC name 1-hydroxy-4-methyl-6-(2,4,4-trimethylpentyl)-1,2-dihydropyridin-2-one; 2-aminoethan-1-ol
- Other names Piroctone ethanolamine; Octopirox

Identifiers
CAS Number	68890-66-4
3D model (JSmol)	Interactive image
ChemSpider	45574
ECHA InfoCard	100.065.957
MeSH	Piroctone+olamine
PubChem CID	50258
UNII	A4V5C6R9FB
CompTox Dashboard (EPA)	DTXSID4046735
- InChI: InChI=1S/C14H23NO2.C2H7NO/c1-10-6-12(15(17)13(16)8-10)7-11(2)9-14(3,4)5;3-1-2-4/h6,8,11,17H,7,9H2,1-5H3;4H,1-3H2 Key: BTSZTGGZJQFALU-UHFFFAOYSA-N; InChI=1/C14H23NO2.C2H7NO/c1-10-6-12(15(17)13(16)8-10)7-11(2)9-14(3,4)5;3-1-2-4/h6,8,11,17H,7,9H2,1-5H3;4H,1-3H2 Key: BTSZTGGZJQFALU-UHFFFAOYAP
- SMILES: CC1=CC(=O)N(C(=C1)CC(C)CC(C)(C)C)O.C(CO)N

Properties
Chemical formula	C_{16}H_{30}N_{2}O_{3}
Molar mass	298.421
- Except where otherwise noted, data are given for materials in their standard state (at 25 °C [77 °F], 100 kPa). (what is ?) Infobox references

Piroctone olamine (INN; also known as piroctone ethanolamine) is an organic compound used as an antimicrobial active in anti-dandruff and anti-seborrhoeic dermatitis scalp products. It is the ethanolamine salt of piroctone, a hydroxamic acid derivative. It is described as a white to slightly yellowish-white crystalline powder with a mild characteristic odour, very slightly soluble in water and freely soluble in ethanol, chloroform, and ether. It has been marketed by Clariant under the trade name Octopirox.

According to later published sources, piroctone olamine was first synthesized in 1979 by Schwarzkopf-Henkel in Germany.

== Uses ==
Piroctone olamine is widely used in anti-dandruff shampoos and other scalp-care products. It has also been used in topical preparations for fungal infections and has been studied in formulations for seborrhoeic dermatitis. In KEGG it is classified as an antiseborrheic drug.

== Mechanism of action ==
Piroctone olamine is generally described as an antifungal active associated with suppression of scalp microorganisms, especially species of Malassezia linked to dandruff and seborrhoeic dermatitis. Proposed mechanisms in the literature include inhibition of ergosterol synthesis and, alternatively, penetration of the fungal cell membrane followed by chelation of iron ions, with interference in mitochondrial energy metabolism. The exact mechanism of action has not been fully established.

== Regulation ==
In the European Union, piroctone olamine is listed in Annex V of Regulation (EC) No 1223/2009 as an allowed preservative in cosmetic products, with a maximum concentration of 1.0% in rinse-off products and 0.5% in other products. The former Scientific Committee on Cosmetic Products and Non-Food Products Intended for Consumers (SCCNFP) also reviewed the safety of piroctone olamine and its monoethanolamine salt for non-preservative uses in leave-on facial products.
