= Selenium disulfide =

Mixture of selenium sulfides

Clinical data
- Trade names: Selseb, Selsun Blue, others
- Other names: Selenium sulfide
- AHFS/Drugs.com: Monograph
- MedlinePlus: a682258
- Routes of administration: Topical
- ATC code: D01AE13 (WHO)

Legal status
- Legal status: AU: S5 (Caution); UK: P (Pharmacy medicines); US: OTC / Rx-only

Identifiers
- CAS Number: 7488-56-4
- PubChem CID: 24087
- DrugBank: DB00971
- ChemSpider: 22519
- UNII: Z69D9E381Q
- KEGG: D05815
- ChEBI: CHEBI:135934
- ChEMBL: ChEMBL1200680
- ECHA InfoCard: 100.028.458

Chemical and physical data
- Formula: S_{2}Se
- Molar mass: 143.09 g·mol^{−1}
- 3D model (JSmol): Interactive image
- Density: 3 g/cm^{3}
- Melting point: 111 °C (232 °F)
- Boiling point: 118 to 119 °C (244 to 246 °F) (decomposes)
- Solubility in water: negligible mg/mL (20 °C)
- SMILES: S=[Se]=S
- InChI: InChI=1S/S2Se/c1-3-2; Key:JNMWHTHYDQTDQZ-UHFFFAOYSA-N

Selenium disulfide, also known as selenium sulfide, is a chemical compound and medication used to treat seborrheic dermatitis, dandruff, and pityriasis versicolor. It is applied to the affected area as a lotion or shampoo. Symptoms frequently return if treatment is stopped.

Side effects may include hair discoloration, skin irritation, and risk of systemic absorption and toxicity, among others. Use is not recommended in children less than 2–5 years old. Use in pregnancy or breastfeeding has not been studied. It consists of a mixture of inorganic covalent compounds having an approximate empirical formulas of SeS_{2}. Selenium disulfide acts as a keratolytic and antifungal agent.

Selenium disulfide was approved for medical use in the United States at least as early as 1951. It is on the World Health Organization's List of Essential Medicines. Selenium disulfide is available as a generic medication and over the counter.

== Medical uses ==
Selenium disulfide is sold as an antifungal agent in shampoos (such as Selsun Blue) for the treatment of dandruff and seborrheic dermatitis associated in the scalp with fungi of genus Malassezia. It is also used on the body to treat tinea versicolor (pityriasis versicolor), a type of fungal skin infection caused by a different species of Malassezia.

A 2015 systematic review of topical treatments for seborrheic dermatitis of the scalp identified only a single randomized controlled trial evaluating selenium disulfide for the condition. It was a three-arm trial of 246 people with moderate to severe dandruff and compared treatment with 2% ketoconazole shampoo (n=97), 2.5% selenium disulfide shampoo (n=100), and placebo (shampoo base with no antiseborrheic agent) (n=49) for 29 days. The study found a 73% reduction in dandruff score with ketoconazole, a 67% reduction with selenium disulfide, and a 45% reduction with placebo. Based on the study, the systematic review concluded that selenium disulfide may be effective in the treatment of dandruff but that the available evidence is limited and overall evidence quality is low. It also found that while selenium disulfide has infrequent side effects, it seems to have more side effects than ketoconazole shampoo. Consequently, the review concluded that selenium disulfide should not be considered as a first-line therapy but instead should be used as an alternative treatment after other therapies like ketoconazole shampoo have proven not effective.

A 2015 review recommended topical antifungal agents, topical corticosteroids, and topical calcineurin inhibitors like tacrolimus as the main treatments for seborrheic dermatitis based on good-quality evidence, rather than selenium disulfide for which evidence is much more limited. However, the review did suggest use of over-the-counter selenium disulfide shampoos as an inexpensive option for managing mild symptoms of seborrheic dermatitis.

=== Available forms ===
Selenium disulfide is available in the form of a prescription drug as a 2.25% medical shampoo. In the United States, a 1% strength is available over-the-counter, and a 2.5% strength is also available with a prescription. In EU only 1% is available and some countries outright banned selenium disulfide (Belgium, Netherlands, Poland). Avaliablilty in shampoos is very rare. In Canada, the 2.5% strength is available over-the-counter. Selsun Blue is an over-the-counter shampoo for dandruff with 1% selenium disulfide as its active ingredient.

== Side effects ==
Side effects of selenium disulfide shampoo for dandruff appear to be infrequent. A randomized controlled trial of 100 people who received selenium disulfide reported side effects of itching or burning sensation of the scalp (3 people), eruption near the hairline (1 person), psoriasis (1 person), lightening or bleaching of hair color (2 people), orange staining of the scalp (1 person), and a chemical taste while shampooing (1 person).

Selenium disulfide can cause discoloration of nails and light hair and can alter the color of hair dyes. Several scattered case reports of orange to red–brown scalp discoloration with selenium sulfide shampoo exist. The discoloration resolved shortly following discontinuation of selenium disulfide shampoo and its removal could be facilitated by lightly swabbing with isopropyl alcohol. Selenium disulfide may also discolor metallic jewellery. Case reports of temporary diffuse hair loss with selenium disulfide shampoo exist as well. Excessive environmental or occupational exposure to selenium has also been associated with hair loss and other adverse effects.

Selenium disulfide should not be applied to damaged skin as there is a risk of systemic absorption and associated toxicity. Systemic symptoms may include tremors, weakness, lethargy, lower abdominal pain, and occasional vomiting. These symptoms usually resolve within 10 days following exposure.

== Pharmacology ==
=== Pharmacodynamics ===
Selenium disulfide acts as an antifungal and keratolytic agent to treat seborrheic dermatitis and dandruff.

=== Pharmacokinetics ===
The systemic absorption and toxicity of orally administered selenium sulfide has been studied in animals. Topical use of selenium sulfide in the form of a shampoo or lotion in humans does not appear to normally increase circulating or urinary selenium levels. However, application of selenium disulfide to damaged skin can result in systemic absorption and has been associated with cases of toxicity. Selenium disulfide appears to be much less toxic than other selenium salts, which may be attributed to its low aqueous solubility and very poor systemic absorption.

== Chemistry ==
=== Composition ===
Structure of 1,2,3-Se_{3}S_{5}, illustrative of selenium sulfide

Selenium disulfide has a composition that approximates to SeS_{2} and is sometimes called selenium sulfide. However, as used in proprietary formulations, it is not a pure chemical compound but a mixture of eight-membered-ring compounds where the overall Se:S ratio is 1:2. The specific chemicals contain a variable number of S and Se atoms, Se_{n}S_{8−n}.

Many selenium sulfides are known, as indicated by ^{77}Se-NMR spectroscopy.

== History ==
Selenium sulfide was introduced for medical use in the United States in 1951.

Selenium monosulfide, along with elemental selenium and sulfur, has been used in medicinal preparations in the past, causing confusion and contradiction as to exactly what form selenium is in any given topical preparation.

Since the active chemicals like selenium sulfide and sulfur are generic and cannot be patented, pharmaceutical companies have shifted their focus toward two other areas to secure new patents and higher profit margins: novel molecular targets and advanced delivery systems.

New Molecular Targets (Specialized Drugs) Instead of using simple antifungal minerals, companies are developing entirely new classes of drugs that target the inflammatory response rather than just the fungus. A primary example is Zoryve (roflumilast), a topical PDE4 inhibitor

Unlike an OTC shampoo, Zoryve is a patented, prescription-strength medication approved by the FDA for seborrheic dermatitis

It works by blocking a specific enzyme to decrease the production of pro-inflammatory mediators in the skin Because it is a new, synthetic molecule, it is protected by patents, allowing the company to price it significantly higher than a bottle of selenium sulfide shampoo.

Novel Delivery Systems (The "How" instead of the "What") Another major area for recent patents is not the medicine itself, but the technology used to deliver it into the skin. Companies are filing patents for:

Nanotechnology: Using solid-lipid nanoparticles, liposomes, and nano-vesicles to encapsulate old drugs

The goal is to make the drug penetrate the skin more deeply or release slowly over time, which allows them to patent the "delivery system" even if the active ingredient is generic MDPI.

Microencapsulation: Creating microcapsules or using cellulosic matrices to stabilize ingredients and improve bioavailability.

In essence, while the "cheap" ingredients are still available, the industry's R&D is focused on moving patients away from generic OTC treatments and toward patented, high-cost prescription therapies and "enhanced" delivery formulations.

== Society and culture ==
=== Popular culture ===
In the 2001 comedy film Evolution selenium was mentioned as an active ingredient of the anti-dandruff shampoo Head & Shoulders. A group of academics, therefore, tried to use this brand of shampoo to stop an alien invasion after discovering that the alien life form was sensitive to selenium.

== Research ==
Selenium disulfide has been suggested to be effective as a treatment for hyperkeratosis based on a small case series of three treated patients. It has also been reported to be effective in the treatment of scalp psoriasis based on clinical observation of over 100 treated patients and two case reports of dramatic response.

Selenium sulfide is under development for the treatment of meibomianitis (meibomian gland dysfunction) and dry eyes in topical and ophthalmic formulations. As of March 2021, it is in phase 2/3 clinical trials for meibomianitis and phase 2 trials for dry eyes. The developmental code name of selenium sulfide for these uses is AZR-MD-001 and it is being developed by Azura Ophthalmics.
