= Dandruff =

Skin condition of the scalp

- Other names: Pityriasis capitis, pityriasis sicca
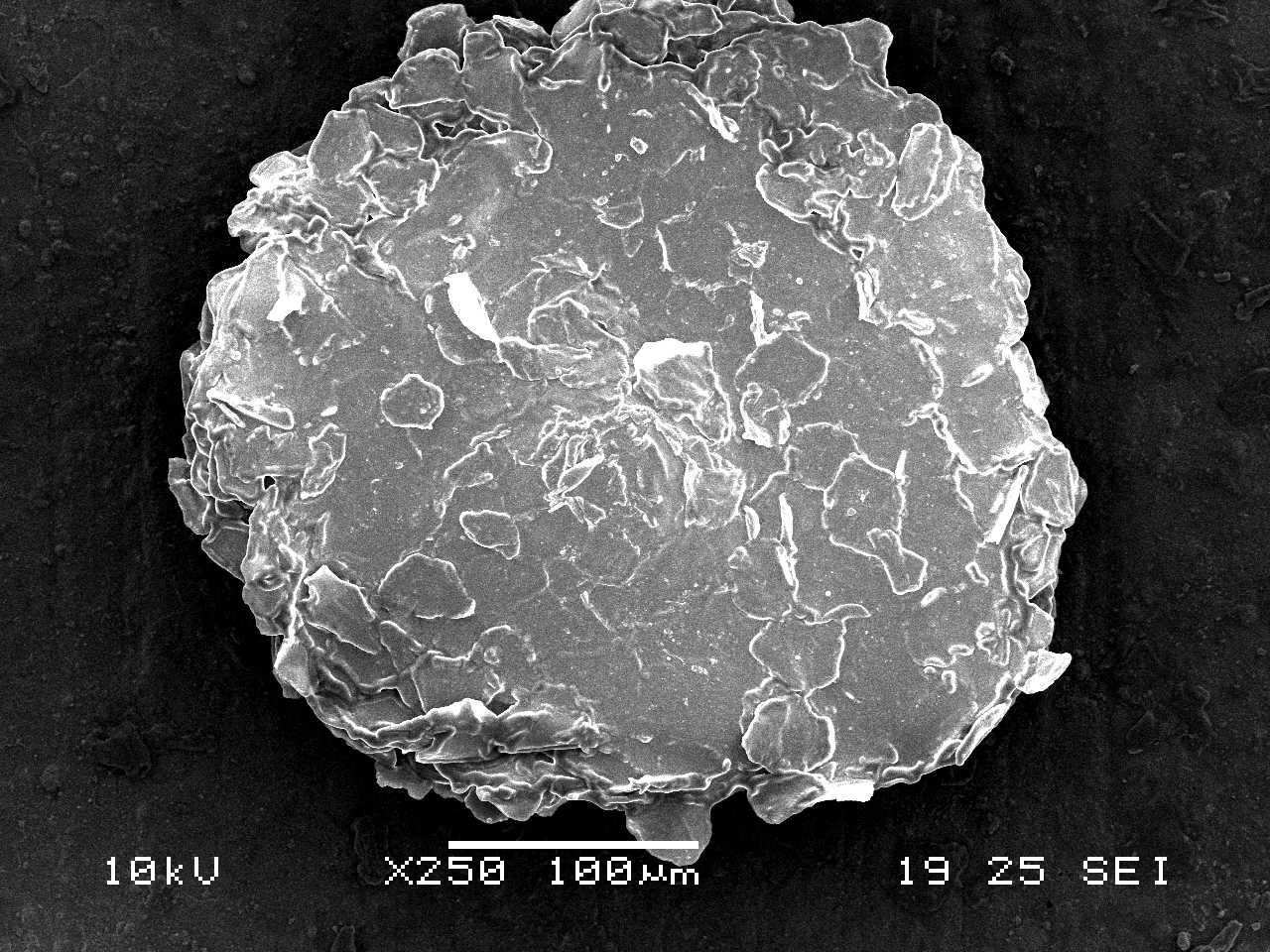
- A microscopic image of human dandruff
- Specialty: Dermatology
- Symptoms: Itchy and flaking skin of the scalp
- Usual onset: Puberty
- Causes: Genetic and environmental factors
- Diagnostic method: Based on symptoms
- Differential diagnosis: Psoriasis, dermatitis, tinea capitis
- Medication: Pyrithione zinc, salicylic acid, coal tar, selenium disulfide, and ketoconazole shampoos
- Frequency: 17-50% of adults

Dandruff is a skin condition of the scalp. Symptoms include heavy flaking and sometimes mild itchiness. It can result in social or self-esteem problems. A more severe form of the condition, which includes inflammation of the skin, is known as seborrhoeic dermatitis.

The cause is unclear, but believed to involve a number of genetic and environmental factors; the condition may worsen in the winter. It is not due to poor hygiene, and the underlying mechanism involves the excessive growth of skin cells. Diagnosis is based on symptoms.

There is no known cure for dandruff. Antifungal cream, such as ketoconazole, or the keratolytic agent salicylic acid may be used to try to improve the condition. Dandruff affects about half of adults, with males more often affected than females. In addition, people in all areas of the world are affected. Onset is usually at puberty, and it becomes less common after the age of 50.

== Etymology ==
According to the Oxford English Dictionary, the word dandruff is first attested in 1545, but is still of unknown etymology.

== Signs and symptoms ==
The main symptoms of dandruff are an itchy scalp and flakiness. Red and greasy patches of skin and a tingly feeling on the skin are also symptoms.

Emerging research suggests a potential association between dandruff and hair loss, primarily through the involvement of the Malassezia fungus and the resultant inflammatory responses. A study published in PubMed investigated the presence of Pityrosporum ovale (now classified as Malassezia) in individuals experiencing hair shedding. The findings indicated that 89.92% of subjects with hair shedding were carriers of Malassezia, compared to only 9.52% in the control group, suggesting a significant correlation between Malassezia colonization and increased hair shedding.

Dandruff and dry scalp are often confused since they share many of the same symptoms, but their causes and treatment are different. Dry scalp is simply dry skin on the scalp and can usually be easily treated with a skin care regimen.

== Causes ==
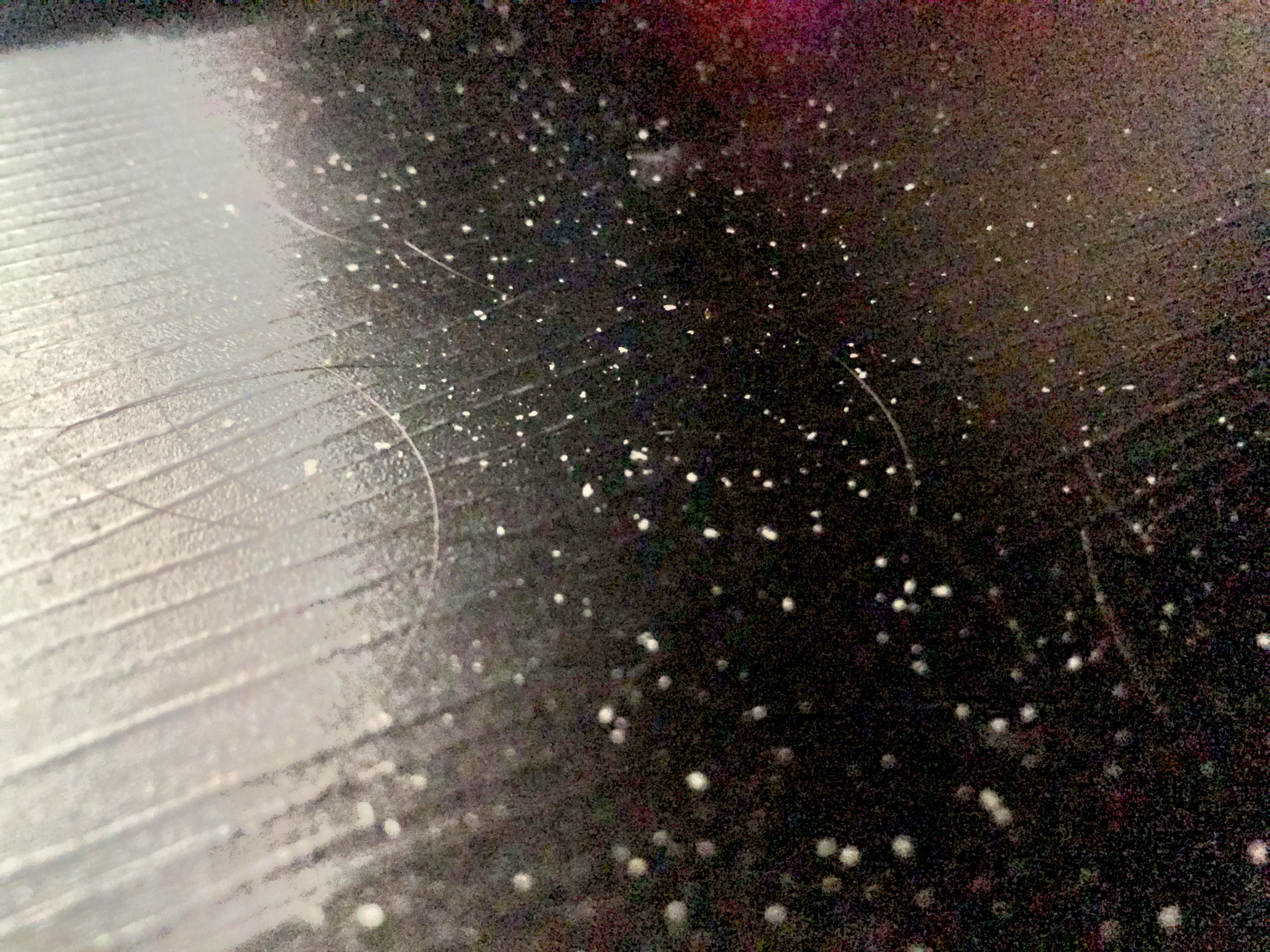
Dandruff with shed hair can be symptomatic of dry skin (shed skin scales and hairs on a dark wooden tabletop)

The cause is unclear but believed to involve a number of genetic and environmental factors.

As the skin layers continually replace themselves, cells are pushed outward where they die and flake off. For most individuals, these flakes of skin are too small to be visible. However, certain conditions cause cell turnover to be unusually rapid, especially in the scalp. It is hypothesized that for people with dandruff, skin cells may mature and be shed in two to seven days, as opposed to around a month in people without dandruff. The result is that dead skin cells are shed in large, oily clumps, which appear as white or grayish flakes on the scalp, skin and clothes.

According to one study, dandruff has been shown to be possibly the result of three factors:

1. Skin oil, commonly referred to as sebum or sebaceous secretions
2. The metabolic by-products of skin micro-organisms (most specifically Malassezia yeasts)
3. Individual susceptibility and allergy sensitivity.

=== Microorganisms ===
Older literature cites the fungus Malassezia furfur (previously known as Pityrosporum ovale) as the cause of dandruff. While this species does occur naturally on the skin surface of people both with and without dandruff, in 2007, it was discovered that the responsible agent is a scalp specific fungus, Malassezia globosa, that metabolizes triglycerides present in sebum by the expression of lipase, resulting in the lipid byproduct oleic acid. In individuals affected by dandruff, the levels of Malassezia are 1.5 to 2 times their normal level. Oleic acid penetrates the top layer of the epidermis, the stratum corneum, and evokes an inflammatory response in susceptible people which disturbs homeostasis and results in erratic cleavage of stratum corneum cells.

Bacteria are also suspected to be a cause. Staphylococcus capitis was found to be 100 times more abundant on scalps affected by dandruff.

For a long time, studies on dandruff predominantly focused on fungi, particularly the Malassezia species, which are major fungi colonizing the human scalp and the dominant members of the cutaneous fungal microbiome. Of the 14 known cultured species of Malassezia, the most clinically significant species are M. restricta and M. globosa. These species have been reported to be associated with skin diseases, including dandruff, seborrheic dermatitis, pityriasis dermatitis, and atopic dermatitis.

However, another microorganism community composed of bacteria also inhabits the human scalp and includes facultative anaerobic bacteria, such as P. acnes, and aerobic bacteria, such as Staphylococcus.

Using 454 pyrosequencing of the microbiome on scalp dandruff, eleven bacterial phyla were detected, but most sequences were assigned to two bacterial phyla: Actinobacteria (64.9%) and Firmicutes (32.5%). Of the 123 identified genera, Propionibacterium (63.3%, Actinobacteria) and Staphylococcus (32.4%, Firmicutes) comprised more than 95% of the total sequences. A total of 99.7% of the Propionibacterium belonged to P. acne, and 94.9% of the Staphylococcus were Staphylococcus spp (including S. epidermidis, S. capitis and S. caprae).

It was found that Propionibacterium decreased from 70.8% to 50.2% in the dandruff group, whereas Staphylococcus increased from 26.0% to 43.5%. Moreover, the proportion of the other low abundance bacteria increased in the dandruff group from 3.2% to 6.4%.

Redundancy analysis (RDA) identified 33 genera related to severity of dandruff including Staphylococcus showed a significant positive correlation with dandruff. In contrast, only two genera (Propionibacterium and Labrys) showed a significant negative correlation with dandruff. Because Staphylococcus and Propionibacterium were the two dominant but reciprocally inhibited bacterial genera on the scalp, these results indicated that dandruff was mainly associated with the balance of these two genera.

Microorganisms on the scalp, especially fungi, have been predominantly thought to be the main cause of the development of dandruff; after several studies it was observed that there was not a close association between the bacteria in genus and fungi in species. Furthermore, the relationship between bacteria and dandruff was stronger than the relationship between fungi and dandruff.

=== Seborrhoeic dermatitis ===
In seborrhoeic dermatitis, redness and itching frequently occur around the folds of the nose and eyebrow areas, not just the scalp. Dry, thick, well-defined lesions consisting of large, silvery scales may be traced to the less common condition of scalp psoriasis. Inflammation can be characterized by redness, heat, pain or swelling, and can cause sensitivity.

Inflammation and extension of scaling outside the scalp exclude the diagnosis of dandruff from seborrhoeic dermatitis. However, many reports suggest a clear link between the two clinical entities - the mildest form of the clinical presentation of seborrhoeic dermatitis as dandruff, where the inflammation is minimal and remains subclinical.

Seasonal changes, stress, and immunosuppression seem to affect seborrheic dermatitis.

== Mechanism ==
Dandruff scale is a cluster of corneocytes, which have retained a large degree of cohesion with one another and detach as such from the surface of the stratum corneum. A corneocyte is a protein complex that is made of tiny threads of keratin in an organised matrix. The size and abundance of scales are heterogeneous from one site to another and over time. Parakeratotic cells often make up part of dandruff. Their numbers are related to the severity of the clinical manifestations, which may also be influenced by seborrhea.

== Treatment ==
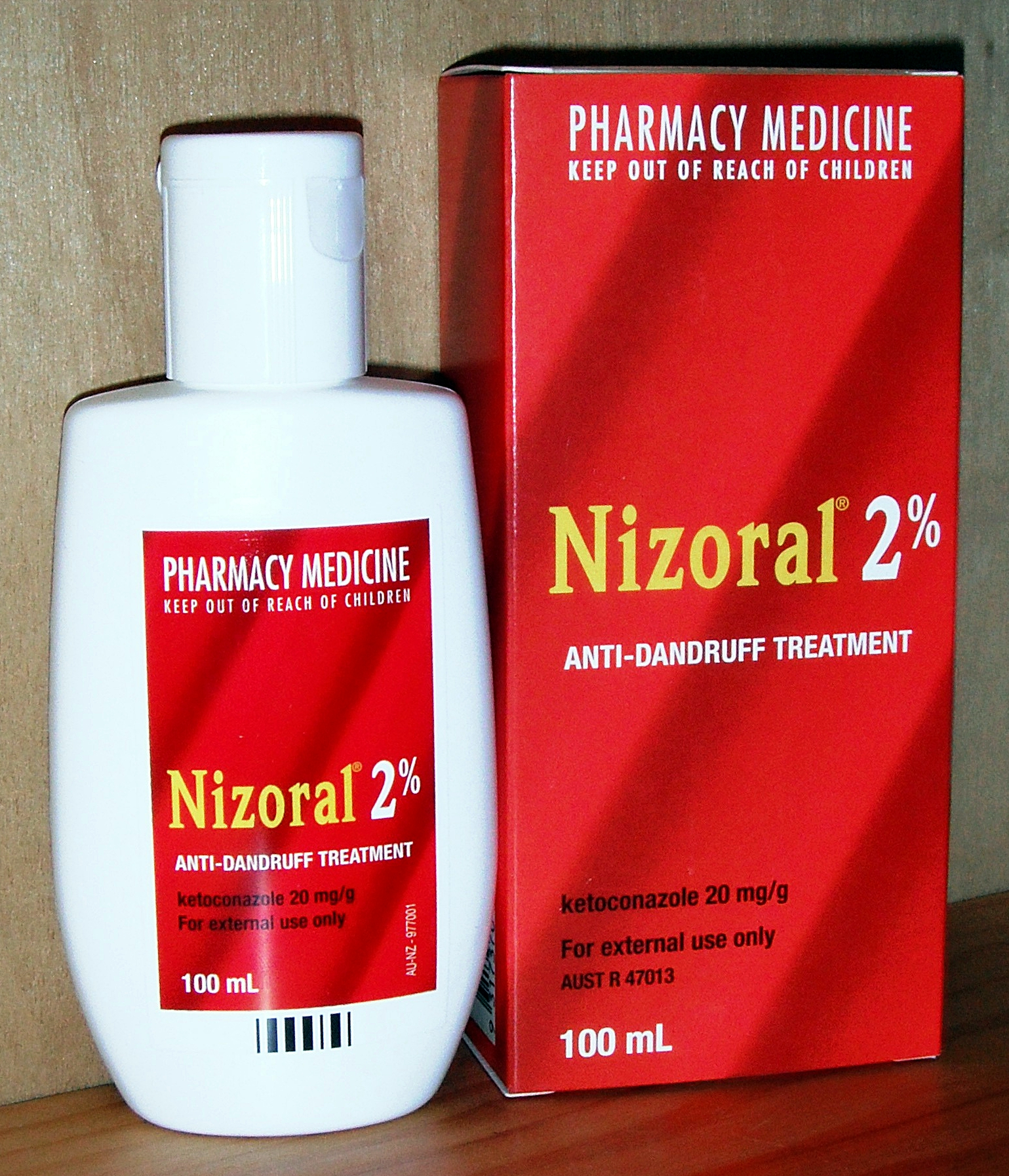
Ketoconazole (Nizoral) shampoo

Shampoos use a combination of special ingredients to control dandruff.

=== Antifungals ===
Antifungal treatments including piroctone olamine, ketoconazole (Sebizole), zinc pyrithione, and selenium disulfide (Selsun Blue) have been found to be effective. Ketoconazole appears to have a longer duration of effect. Ketoconazole is a broad-spectrum antimycotic agent that is active against Candida and M. furfur. Of all the antifungals of the imidazole class, ketoconazole has become the leading contender among treatment options because of its effectiveness in treating seborrheic dermatitis as well.

Ciclopirox (topical route) may also be used as an anti-dandruff agent. However, it is mostly sold as cream and its main use is for treating athlete's foot, jock itch, and ringworm.

Other than zinc pyrithione, the most common anti-dandruff actives (outside the US) and part of many cosmetic shampoos, are piroctone olamine and climbazole. Very recent anti-dandruff shampoos use a new ester technology, propanediol caprylate.

Despite not being a direct antifungal, oral isotretinoin is able to clear dandruff and seborrheic dermatitis due to its strong suppression of sebum production via induction of apoptosis in sebaceous glands, which destroys the living space of the fungus who rely on sebum rich regions to thrive, thus significantly reducing the population of M. furfur and consequently relieving dandruff and its associated symptoms. However, it is typically not used for this purpose alone due to its high potential for systemic adverse effects and the availability of safer alternative agents listed above, but it is sometimes used at lower doses to treat severe treatment resistant seborrheic dermatitis.

=== Exfoliating agents ===
Coal tar causes the skin to shed dead cells from the top layer and slows skin cell growth.

Salicylic acid is an approved anti-dandruff active as per the US FDA OTC drug monograph and also used in many cosmetic anti-dandruff shampoos globally.
