= Opella =

French multinational pharmaceutical company

Opella Healthcare Group S.A.S.

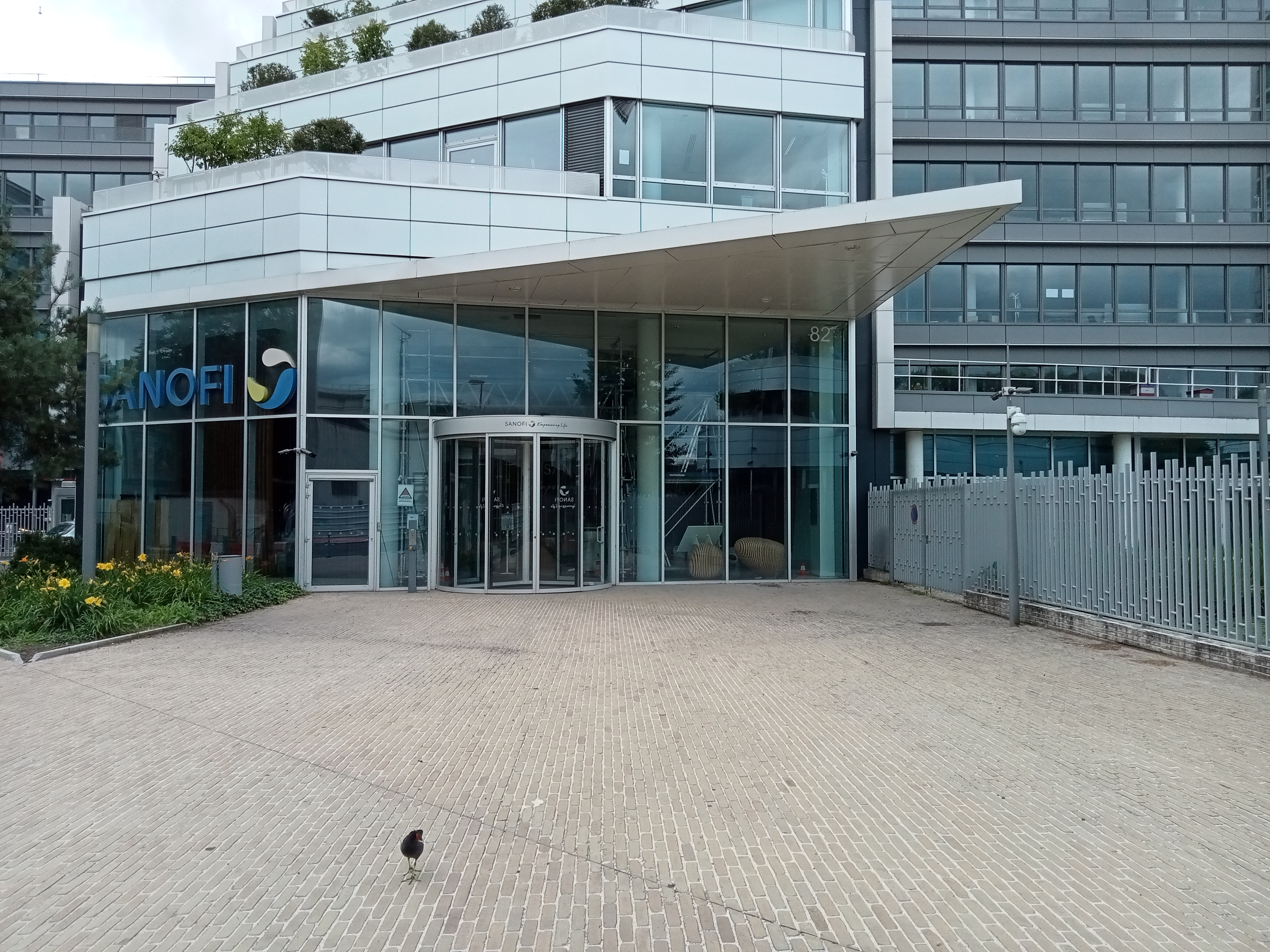
- Opella's operational headquarters in Gentilly, near Paris, France.
- Type: Private
- Industry: Healthcare, Over-the-counter drug
- Founded: 2018; 8 years ago in Neuilly-sur-Seine, France
- Founder: Sanofi
- Headquarters: Neuilly-sur-Seine
- Key people: Julie Van Ongevalle (CEO)
- Owner: CD&R (50%); Sanofi (48.2%); Bpifrance (1.8%)
- Number of employees: 11,000 (2024)
- Parent: Sanofi (until 2024)
- Subsidiaries: Opella North America; Opella Healthcare France
- Website: https://www.opella.com/en

Opella Healthcare Group S.A.S., doing business as Opella, and formerly Sanofi Consumer Healthcare (CHC), is a French multinational pharmaceutical company specializing in consumer healthcare products. Opella's activities include dietary supplements and over-the-counter medicines such as Mucosolvan (ambroxol), Allegra (fexofenadine), and the French brand Doliprane (paracetamol).

Until 2024, Opella was wholly owned by French pharmaceutical company Sanofi, at which point it sold 50% of the subsidiary to US private equity fund CD&R. Sanofi retains 48.2% of Opella, while France's public investment bank, Bpifrance, has acquired 1.8%.

In the US, Sanofi Consumer Healthcare, then Opella, owns 100% of Chattem, Inc., doing business as Sanofi Consumer Health North America, then Opella North America.

== History ==
=== Origins ===
Doliprane, the core of Sanofi's consumer healthcare business (CHC and OTC), originated, according to the pharmaceutical group, in the Bottu laboratories, where it was invented by Parisian pharmacist Henri Bottu and his son-in-law Jacques Dagniolle. Subsequently, Bottu Laboratories passed through the hands of several pharmaceutical companies, including the BSN Group (1985–1987), Rhône-Poulenc (1987–1999), Aventis (1999–2004), and finally Sanofi-Aventis from 2004 onwards, which became Sanofi in 2011.

On December 21, 2009, Sanofi-Aventis acquired the US pharmaceutical group Chattem (now Opella North America) and its 488 employees, based in Tennessee, one of the leaders in the sale of non-prescription and self-medication drugs in the United States, making Sanofi the world's fifth largest manufacturer of over-the-counter (OTC) drugs.

=== Opella (since 2018) ===
The French company "Sanofi 2018 C", which is to consolidate the consumer health activities of the French pharmaceutical group Sanofi, namely its Sanofi Consumer Healthcare (CHC) and OTC divisions, was created in 2018 and renamed Opella in 2020, while remaining a division of the group.

In July 2023, Sanofi will inaugurate the Lab 157, a new site in Neuilly-sur-Seine, designed to accommodate up to 680 employees from its Consumer Healthcare (CHC) division in nearly 6,680 m^{2} of office space.

On October 27, 2023, French group Sanofi announced its intention to divest its subsidiary Opella in 2024 in order to refocus on the production of innovative vaccines and more profitable patented drugs. Sanofi's Consumer Healthcare (CHC) division will then account for 12% of the group's sales in 2024.

On October 20, 2024, Sanofi announced the sale of 50% of its subsidiary Opella, which manufactures and markets Sanofi's over-the-counter medicines, including Doliprane, to the American investment fund CD&R (Clayton, Dubilier & Rice) for €10 billion. The sale has caused a stir among the French public and politicians because it involves a basic medicine that has been used by many French people for several generations.

On May 6, 2025, Julie Van Ongevalle, former head of Sanofi CHC, becomes president of Opella Healthcare Group, while Ségolène de Marsac is appointed head of the French subsidiary.

== Brands ==
The following are the current brands sold by Opella :

- ACT (anti-cavity mouthwash)
- Algopyrin (analgesic/anti-inflammatory/antipyretic)
- Allegra (anti-allergy)
- Aspercreme (pain relief)
- Bisolvon (respiratory tract)
- Buscopan (antispasmodic/abdominal pain)
- Cenovis (vitamins and naturals)
- Combiflam (ibuprofen/paracetamol)
- Doliprane (paracetamol/pain relief)
- Dorflex (analgesic/pain relief)
- Dulcolax (laxative)
- Dulcoflex (laxative)
- Enterogermina (probiotic)
- Essentiale (gastrointestinal/phospholipid)
- EVE (pain relief)
- Icy Hot (analgesic/pain relief)
- Lactacyd (personal hygiene)
- Maalox (gastrointestinal)
- Magne B6 (vitamins and naturals)
- Mucosolvan (respiratory tract)
- Nature's Own (vitamins and naturals)
- No-Spa (antispasmodic and gastrointestinal)
- Novalgina (cold and flu remedy)
- Novanuit (food supplment and sleep aid)
- Pharmaton (vitamins and naturals)
- Physiomer (nasal hygiene/cold and flu remedy)
- Phytoxil (cough relief)
- Qunol (vitamins and naturals)
- Rhinospray (nasal hygiene/cold and flu remedy)
- SHEVEU (hair care)
- Telfast (anti-allergy)
- Thomapyrin (pain relief)
- Toplexil (cough relief)
- Unisom (cold and flu remedy)
- Xyzal (antihistamine)

== Locations ==
The transfer of Sanofi's consumer healthcare activities (CHC and OTC) to its new subsidiary Opella Healthcare represented nearly 11,000 employees worldwide.

Opella's main locations around the world :

=== Africa ===
- Megrine (Tunisia), production site serving the Egyptian and Tunisian markets.
- New Cairo (Egypt), offices.

=== Americas ===
- Chattanooga (United States), production site serving the North, Central, and South American markets, resulting from the acquisition of Chattem, Inc. by Sanofi-Aventis in 2009.
- Pine Brook (United States), offices.
- Morristown (United States), offices.
- Laval (Canada), offices.
- Ocoyoacac (Mexico), production site serving the North, Central, and South American markets.
- Mexico City (Mexico), offices.
- Suzano (Brazil), production site serving the North, Central, and South American markets.
- Buenos Aires (Argentina), R&D laboratory and offices.
- São Paulo (Brazil), distribution center and offices.
- Bogotá (Colombia), offices.
- etc.

=== Asia ===
- Narita (Japan), production site serving 11 Asian markets.
- Ho Chi Minh City (Vietnam), production site serving 11 Asian markets.
- Dubai (United Arab Emirates), scientific office.
- Riyadh (Saudi Arabia), technical and scientific office.
- Jeddah (Saudi Arabia), offices.
- Singapore, offices.
- Seoul (South Korea), offices.
- Beijing (China), offices.
- Shanghai (China), offices.
- Mumbai (India), offices.
- Hyderabad (India), offices.
- etc.

=== Europe ===
- Neuilly-sur-Seine (France), global headquarters and offices.
- Lisieux (France), production site dedicated to the European market.
- Compiègne (France), production site dedicated to the European market, produces 140 million boxes per year, including Doliprane[1].
- Cologne (Germany), production site dedicated to the European market.
- Frankfurt am Main (Germany), offices.
- Rzeszów (Poland), production site dedicated to the European market.
- Warsaw (Poland), research center and offices[2].
- Budapest (Hungary), offices.
- Veresegyház (Hungary), production site dedicated to the European market.
- Origgio (Italy), production site dedicated to the European market.
- Bucharest (Romania), offices.
- Vienna (Austria), offices.
- Diegem (Belgium), offices.
- Barcelona (Spain), offices.
- etc.

=== Oceania ===
- Sydney (Australia), offices.
- Brisbane (Australia), offices.
- Virginia (Australia), manufacturing site.

== See also ==
- Sanofi
