= Opella North America =

American healthcare product company

Chattem, Inc.

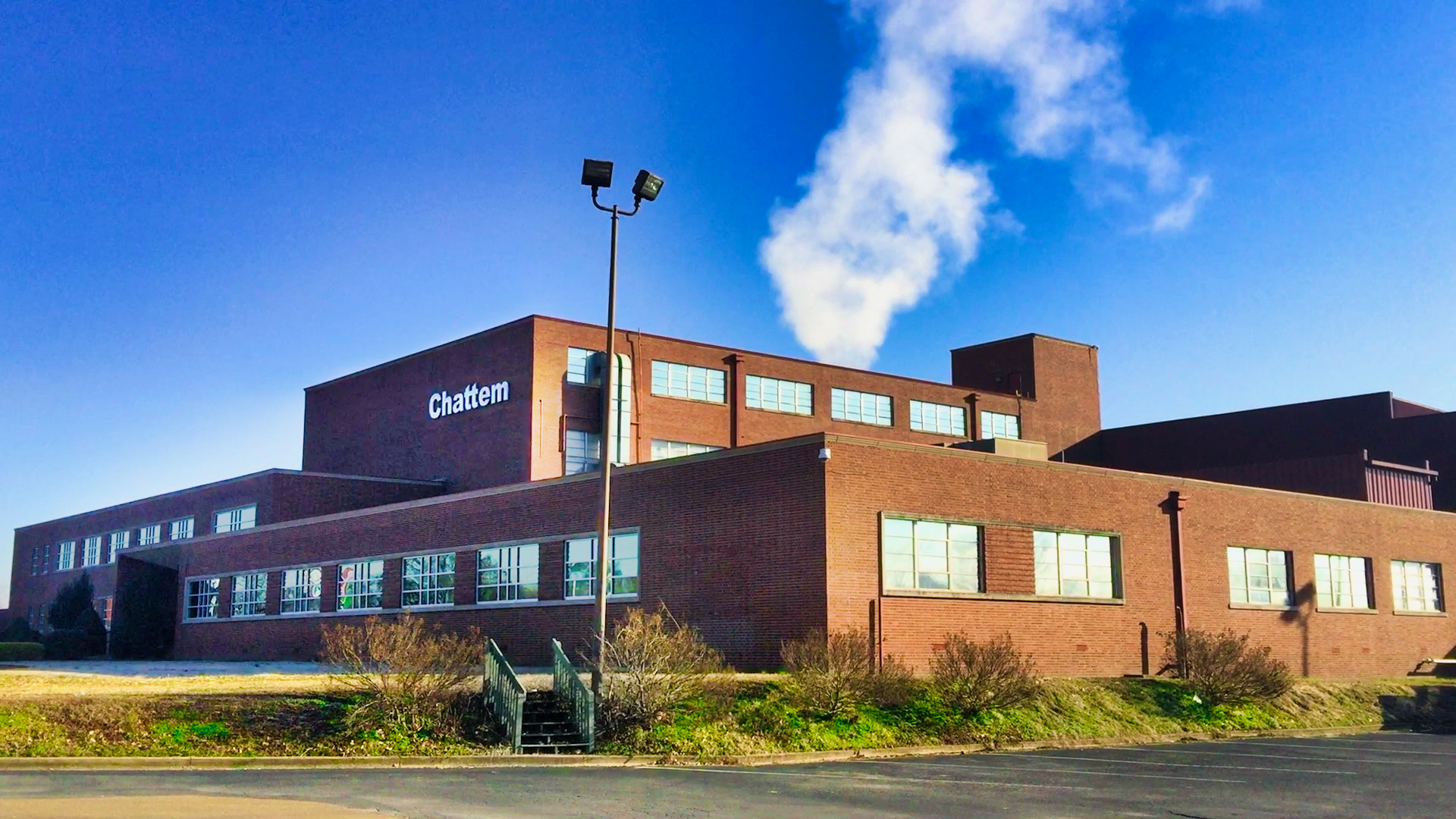
- Company type: Subsidiary
- Industry: Healthcare; Over-the-counter-drug manufacturing
- Founded: Tennessee (January 30, 1879, as the Chattanooga Medicine Company)
- Headquarters: Chattanooga, Tennessee
- Key people: Zan Guerry (chairman); Shaquille O'Neal (brand spokesman) IcyHot and Gold Bond
- Products: Allegra, Gold Bond, ACT Mouthwash, Cortizone-10, Flexall, IcyHot, Sun-In, Ultra Swim, Pamprin, Premsyn, Kaopectate, Dexatrim, Aspercreme, Selsun Blue, Nasacort, Unisom, Capzasin, Benzodent, Herpecin-L, Garlique, and New Phase
- Revenue: $1 Billion (USD) (2013)
- Owner: Opella
- Number of employees: 536
- Parent: Opella
- Website: opella.com/en

Chattem, Inc., doing business as Opella North America, is an American, Chattanooga, Tennessee-based, producer and marketer of over-the-counter healthcare products, toiletries, dietary supplements, topical analgesics, and medicated skin care products. The company is a subsidiary of the French multinational pharmaceutical company Sanofi until 2024, now a subsidiary of the French-American multinational pharmaceutical company Opella.

Originally named the Chattanooga Medicine Company, the company’s brand portfolio holds twenty-two brands including Allegra, Gold Bond, Flexall, IcyHot, Rolaids, Sun-In, Pamprin, Dexatrim, Aspercreme, and Selsun Blue. The company produces two-thirds of its products at its Chattanooga production facilities with the remaining produced by third-party producers.

The company’s brands are sold nationally through mass merchandiser, drug and food retailers. In 2005, 70% of the firm's sales were made through its top ten customers, which include Wal-Mart, Walgreens, and Kroger. Sales to Wal-Mart constituted 36% of Chattem’s total sales in 2005. Chattem supports these sales with a forty-five-person sales force and broadcast media advertising. Chattem has market penetration in the United States, Europe, Canada, Latin America, and the Caribbean.

== History ==
- Chattem was founded by Zeboim Cartter Patten as the Chattanooga Medicine Company in 1879. The company incorporated in 1909 and has remained in Chattanooga, Tennessee, to this day.
- During World War II, the Chattanooga Medicine Company turned into a major supplier of K-Rations to the US Army, producing 34 million rations from 1942 to 1945, earning 5 "E" Awards for support of war efforts.
- The firm adopted Chattem as its name and went public in 1969.
- Chattem’s top and bottom lines grew significantly from 1989 through 1992. The source of this growth was the company’s strategy of purchasing under-marketed consumer brands and aggressively marketing those in its portfolio. In 1993, Chattem experienced a 14% decline in sales from the loss of Warner-Lambert’s Rolaids business. To fund a one-time special dividend in 1994, $75 million in high-yield bonds were issued.
- In January 2013, Chattem acquired the full rights to Rolaids, which had seen its brand wounded under the ownership of Johnson & Johnson's McNeil Consumer Healthcare with a series of product recalls and quality control issues throughout 2010 that ended with most of the Rolaids line discontinued. In September, 2013 Chattem returned Rolaids to the market with new trade dress, though production of Rolaids is not expected to return to Chattanooga.
- In March 2014, Chattem sold Dexatrim to NVE Pharmaceuticals.

=== Recent events ===
In October 2006, Chattem announced it would acquire five brands for $410 million as a result of the merger between Johnson & Johnson and the consumer healthcare business of Pfizer. These brands are:

- ACT Anti-Cavity Mouthwash
- Unisom
- Cortizone 10
- Kaopectate
- Balmex-Diaper Rash Ointment

Pending the US government’s approval of the merger of Johnson & Johnson and Pfizer Consumer Healthcare, Chattem will acquire five brands divested from the firms. Chattem has announced it expects to take possession of the brands around January 2007. These mature brands will provide $150 million in additional revenue to Chattem per year.

On December 21, 2009, Paris-based (France) Sanofi, the world's fourth largest drugmaker, said it was acquiring Chattem in a $1.9 billion cash deal. Sanofi said the acquisition would be completed by the first quarter of 2010.

In 2020, Sanofi Consumer Healthcare (CHC), based in Neuilly-sur-Seine near Paris, became Opella, with the ultimate goal of being sold by the French pharmaceutical group Sanofi. Sanofi Consumer Healthcare North America (Chattem, Inc.) then adopted the name Opella.

In 2024, Sanofi announced the sale of 50% of Opella (including Chattem) to the American private equity company CD&R. Sanofi retained 48.2% and Bpifrance (the French government's public investment bank) acquired 1.2%.

== Current brands ==
Chattem manufactures many over-the-counter healthcare products. They are marketed in three categories: pain relief, skin & hair care, and health & wellness.

=== Pain relief ===
- Arthritis Hot
- Aspercreme
- Capzasin
- Cortizone 10
- Flexall
- Icy Hot
- Sportscreme

=== Skin & hair care ===
- Gold Bond
- Gold Bond Ultimate
- Selsun Blue

=== Health & wellness ===
- ACT Oral Care
- Allegra
- Kaopectate
- Nasacort
- Unisom
- Unisom Natural Nights
- Xyzal
