= Paul Hudson (businessman) =

British pharmaceutical executive (born 1967)

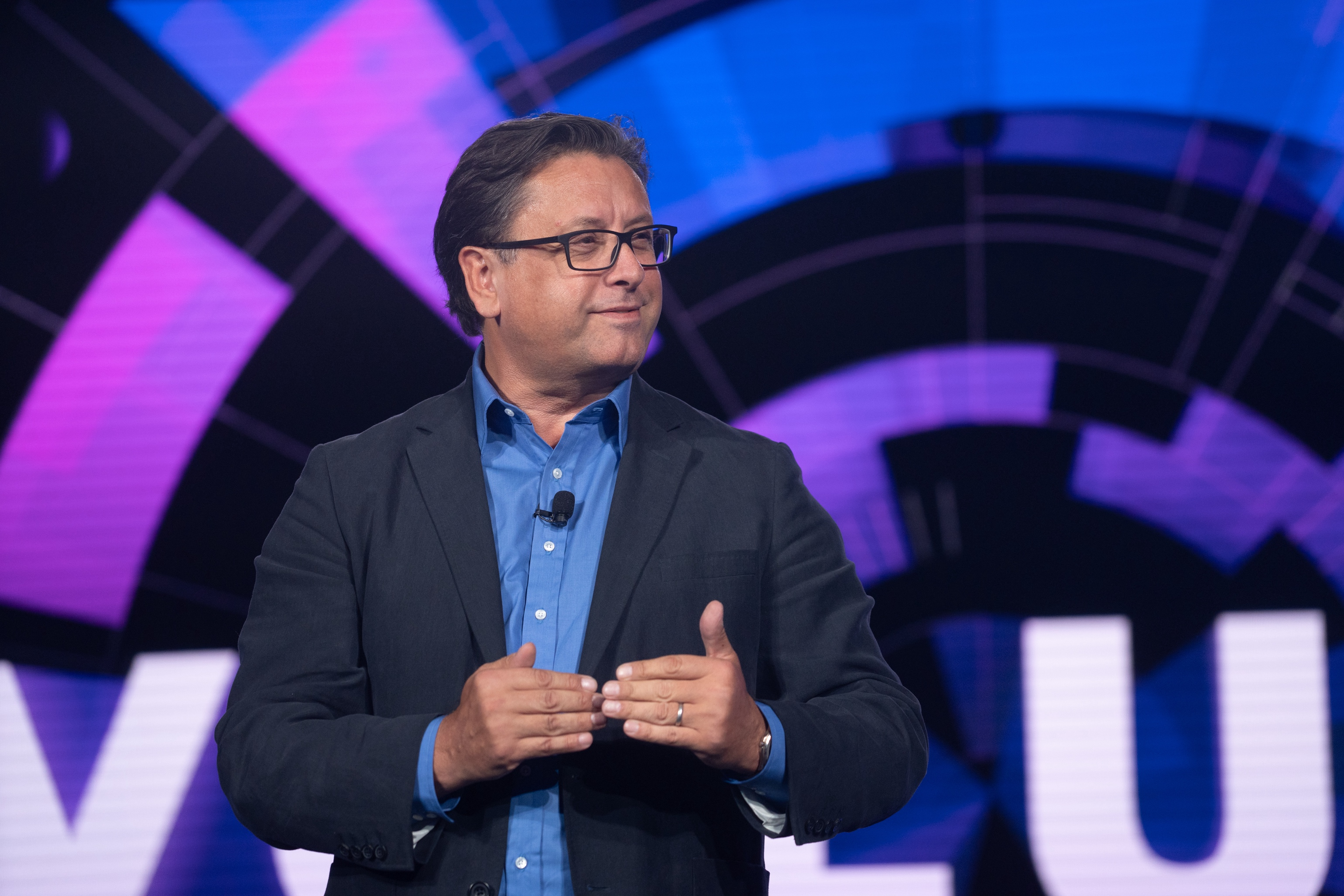
- Hudson in 2023
- Born: 14 October 1967
- Education: Manchester Metropolitan University
- Title: Former CEO, Sanofi
- Term: September 2019 – February 2026
- Predecessor: Olivier Brandicourt
- Successor: Belén Garijo
- Children: 3

Paul Hudson (born 14 October 1967) is a British businessman, and the former chief executive (CEO) of Sanofi, the world's fifth largest pharmaceutical company by prescription drug sales.

== Early life ==
Hudson earned a degree in economics from Manchester Metropolitan University, and a diploma in marketing from the Chartered Institute of Marketing.

== Career ==
Hudson was CEO of Sanofi since September 2019. In February 2026, it was announced Hudson’s mandate would not be renewed and he will step down as CEO.

Hudson was previously CEO of Novartis Pharmaceuticals, and before that AstraZeneca, rising to president, AstraZeneca United States and Executive Vice President, North America.

== Recognition ==
Hudson was awarded an honorary doctorate by Manchester Metropolitan University in 2018.

== Personal life ==
Hudson has three children and is an "ardent Manchester United football fan".

Business positions
| Preceded by Olivier Brandicourt | CEO of Sanofi; 2019–2026 | Succeeded by Belén Garijo |
