= Selsun Blue =

Over-the-counter brand of dandruff shampoo

- Product type: Shampoo
- Current owner: Opella
- Previous owners: Abbott Laboratories; Chattem
- Website: www.selsunblue.com

Selsun Blue is an over-the-counter brand of anti-dandruff shampoo produced by Opella (formerly known as Sanofi Consumer Healthcare).

== History ==
Selsun Blue was first sold in the United States in 1953. In 1974, the product became available as an over-the-counter shampoo. The product was first sold by Abbott Laboratories, however the brand was bought by Chattem in 2002, which in turn was acquired by Sanofi in 2010. In some markets, Selsun Blue is sold by Rohto Pharmaceutical.

== Formulations ==
Selsun Blue has been marketed as a more effective alternative to brand leader Head & Shoulders due to its superior performance in randomized trials. Over-the-counter Selsun Blue contains 1% selenium sulfide as its active ingredient in its most popular version (the word "Selsun" is a portmanteau of selenium sulfide + n). Chattem announced that on November 1, 2005, they would introduce a new line of shampoos under the brand name Selsun Salon. These contained a different active ingredient than Selsun Blue, pyrithione zinc 1%, and are oriented toward the higher-end shampoo market. Other active ingredients such as salicylic acid and botanicals are in other versions of Selsun Blue brand dandruff shampoo.

In 2011, the Selsun Blue brand consisted of 15 products spread across two brand segments, Naturals and Base. The Naturals line of products contains the active ingredient salicylic acid in addition to 8 moisturizers & botanicals plus vitamins B5 & E. Salicylic acid is a keratolytic agent that assists with cell shedding or flaking. The base brand consists of six types including Medicated with menthol, 2-in-1, Normal to Oily, Moisturizing, Itchy Dry Scalp, and Deep Cleansing with micro beads. The first four types contain the active ingredient selenium sulfide which has been shown to have anti-fungal properties. More specifically, selenium sulfide, an anti-infective agent, relieves itching and flaking of the scalp and removes the dry, scaly particles commonly referred to as dandruff or seborrhea. Selenium sulfide is also used to treat tinea versicolor, a fungal infection of the skin.

Deep Cleansing was launched by Chattem in January 2011. In addition to the active ingredient salicylic acid, the product touts itself as containing scrubbing micro beads.
