= Dexatrim =

Dietary supplement

Dexatrim is an over-the-counter (OTC) dietary supplement meant to assist with weight loss. Dexatrim claims it "gives you the power to lose weight, curb binges, and keep you in control of your diet." Current Dexatrim products available are in capsule form and include Dexatrim Max Complex 7, Dexatrim Max Daytime Appetite Control, Dexatrim Natural Green Tea, and Dexatrim Natural Extra Energy. The major active ingredients found in current Dexatrim products include caffeine, green tea extract, Asian (Panax) ginseng root extract, and dehydroepiandrosterone (DHEA).

== Active Ingredients: Weight Loss Efficacy & Potential Side Effects ==
=== Caffeine ===
The caffeine content in the daily recommended dose of Dexatrim products ranges from 50–400 mg per day. There are a number of studies showing that caffeine has a short-term stimulatory effect on basal metabolic rate. However, in 1992, in a double-blind placebo controlled study, caffeine (at a dose of 200 mg daily) was found to be no more effective in promoting weight loss than a placebo. Potential side effects of caffeine may include insomnia, anxiety, gastrointestinal discomfort, diarrhea, headaches and abnormal heart beat.

=== Green tea extract ===
Green tea extract is currently used for a variety of conditions including improving mental alertness and aiding in weight loss. There is currently insufficient data to determine the efficacy of green tea extract in aiding weight loss. In addition to the potential side effects from the caffeine content in green tea extract, there is some risk of liver problems associated with green tea extract consumption. Liver problems have not been observed with the use of green tea in beverages.

=== Asian (panax) ginseng root extract ===
Asian (panax) ginseng is used for a wide variety of conditions—without US Food & Drug Administration (FDA) approval—including aiding in thinking and memory, diabetes, erectile dysfunction, premature ejaculation, and weight loss. However, scientific data across a wide range of studies does not support the health claims associated with ginseng use. Short-term use of ginseng (under 3 months) is unlikely to produce side effects and appears safe for most people. Side effects, often associated with longer term use, can include headaches, insomnia, and gastrointestinal problems. There are many conditions in which ginseng use has special precautions and warnings. These include pregnancy, diabetes, auto-immune diseases, and bleeding disorders.

=== Dehydroepiandrosterone (DHEA) ===
Dehydroepiandrosterone (DHEA) is a steroid hormone produced by the adrenal glands (and by the testes in men), which can be converted in the body to male and female sex hormones, including estrogen and testosterone. DHEA is used to treat a variety of conditions (without FDA approval) including aging, Alzheimer's disease, schizophrenia, erectile dysfunction, systemic lupus erythematosus, and for aiding in weight loss. There is insufficient data to support DHEA’s efficacy for weight loss. The DHEA content in the daily recommended dose of Dexatrim Max ranges from 100–200 mg per day. Side effects at this dose can include acne, hair loss, facial hair growth and deeper voice in women, stomach upset, and high blood pressure, particularly if the supplement is used for a longer period of time. There are many conditions in which DHEA use has special precautions and warnings. These include pregnancy and breast-feeding, hormone-sensitive conditions and cancers, liver problems, diabetes, and cholesterol problems. DHEA use is banned by the National Collegiate Athletic Association (NCAA).

== History of Dexatrim ==
Dexatrim has been on the market for more than 45 years. The brand was originally owned by Thompson Medical, which was acquired by Chattem in 1998. It is now part of Sanofi. Dexatrim formula has changed considerably over the years. In prior formulations, Dexatrim contained the decongestant phenylpropanolamine (PPA) and the amphetamine-like compound ephedra. A 2000 study by Yale University School of Medicine showed an increased risk of hemorrhagic stroke with taking PPA. A case of myocardial injury was also reported using Dexatrim (with PPA) at doses recommended for weight control. In 2000, following the request of the FDA to discontinue marketing drug products containing PPA, Dexatrim dropped PPA from its formula. In 2004, FDA banned a second Dexatrim ingredient, ephedra. Although ephedra showed some effectiveness for short-term weight loss, it was linked to raising blood pressure and increasing the risk of heart problems and stroke. In March 2014, Chattem sold Dexatrim to NVE Pharmaceuticals.

== Controversy over use and possible adverse effects ==
Currently, no over-the-counter weight-loss supplements have met criteria for recommended use by physicians. Dexatrim claims to provide a powerful benefit for weight loss despite the lack of scientific data to support their claims. Dexatrim further provides a disclaimer that no claims of efficacy and safety made by Dexatrim have been approved by the FDA. Although available OTC, the active ingredients in Dexatrim products carry risk of side effects, adverse reactions and adverse drug interactions, particularly if used at high-recommended or higher-than-recommended doses and/or for prolonged periods. The Dexatrim product itself carries a warning about the possible side effects of Dexatrim in patients with a history of high blood pressure, and also recommends the advice of a qualified physician before taking Dexatrim. In addition, the use of Dexatrim or other OTC weight-loss supplements presents a possible factor in establishing disruptive eating patterns, increases the risk that individuals will use these OTC supplements in lieu of seeking proper medical and nutritional consultation, and presents increased psychological risks associated with unsuccessful weight-loss attempts.
