= Gold bond =

Gold bond may refer to:

- Bond (finance), a promissory instrument that can be redeemed for gold such as a United States gold certificate
- Gold Bond, brand of over-the-counter skin care products
- Gold Bond Trading Company, later Carlson Companies, a company that dealt in trading stamps
