= Nature's Own =

Nature's Own may refer to

- Nature's Own, an American brand of baked goods sold by Flowers Foods
- Nature's Own, an Australian brand of supplements owned by Opella (formerly Sanofi Consumer Healthcare)
