= Chris Viehbacher =

German-Canadian businessman (born 1960)

Chris Viehbacher (born 1960) is a German-Canadian businessman. He served as the Chief Executive Officer of Sanofi and Chairman of Genzyme until 29 October 2014. Viehbacher then worked with Gurnet Point Capital, a healthcare venture capital and private equity fund backed by Ernesto Bertarelli and his family.

He joined Biogen as President and Chief Executive Officer and member of the Board of Directors in November 2022.

== Early life ==
Chris Viehbacher was born on March 26, 1960. He graduated from Queen's University in Kingston, Ontario, Canada. He is a certified public accountant, and he speaks French, German and English.

== Career ==
Viehbacher started his career at PriceWaterhouseCoopers. In 1988, he joined GlaxoSmithKline, where he worked for the next twenty years, including in France for ten years. Until October 29, 2014, he served as CEO of Sanofi and Chairman of Genzyme. He was fired by unanimous decision of the board of directors in 2014. In 2022, Viehbacher joined Biogen as President and Chief Executive Officer.

Viehbacher was Chairman of the Pharmaceutical Research and Manufacturers of America from December 2010 to April 2012. He has been Chair of the CEO Roundtable on Cancer since February 2011. He is a member of The Business Roundtable and the International Business Council. He sits on the Board of Directors of Research America and the Burroughs Wellcome Fund. He will serve as President of the European Federation of Pharmaceutical Industries and Associations from June 2013 onwards.

In 2003, Viehbacher became a Knight in the Legion of Honour. In 2012, he received the Pasteur Foundation Award. He sits on the Northeastern University Board of Trustees and the Board of Visitors of the Fuqua School of Business at Duke University.

== Personal life ==
Viehbacher is married and has three children.

Business positions
Preceded by Gérard Le Fur	CEO of Sanofi; 2008–2014	Succeeded by Olivier Brandicourt
Preceded by Michel Vounatsos	CEO of Biogen; 2022–Present	Succeeded by --
