= Oxomemazine =

Chemical compound

Clinical data
- AHFS/Drugs.com: International Drug Names
- ATC code: R06AD08 (WHO)

Legal status
- Legal status: US: Not approved; In general: ℞ (Prescription only)

Identifiers
- IUPAC name: 3-(5,5-Dioxido-10H-phenothiazin-10-yl)-N,N,2-trimethylpropan-1-amine
- CAS Number: 3689-50-7
- PubChem CID: 19396
- ChemSpider: 18281
- UNII: 305MB38V1C
- KEGG: D07401
- ChEMBL: ChEMBL2104734
- CompTox Dashboard (EPA): DTXSID5023405
- ECHA InfoCard: 100.020.906

Chemical and physical data
- Formula: C_{18}H_{22}N_{2}O_{2}S
- Molar mass: 330.45 g·mol^{−1}
- 3D model (JSmol): Interactive image
- SMILES: O=S3(=O)c1ccccc1N(c2c3cccc2)CC(C)CN(C)C
- InChI: InChI=1S/C18H22N2O2S/c1-14(12-19(2)3)13-20-15-8-4-6-10-17(15)23(21,22)18-11-7-5-9-16(18)20/h4-11,14H,12-13H2,1-3H3; Key:QTQPVLDZQVPLGV-UHFFFAOYSA-N

Oxomemazine is an antihistamine and anticholinergic of the phenothiazine chemical class for the treatment of cough.

== See also ==
- Oxomemazine/guaifenesin
