= Oxomemazine/guaifenesin =

Combination drug

Combination of
- Oxomemazine: H_{1} receptor antagonist (antihistamine)
- Guaifenesin: expectorant

Clinical data
- Trade names: Toplexil and others
- Routes of administration: Oral
- ATC code: none

Identifiers
- CAS Number: 153445-20-6

Oxomemazine/guaifenesin is a sedative antihistamine plus expectorant. It is a combination of oxomemazine and guaifenesin.

It is sold under a variety of brand names including Toplexil by Aventis. It is sold over the counter in France, Morocco, Egypt, Algeria, South Korea and the UAE. The oxomemazine ingredient (antihistamine) is not approved by the U.S. Food and Drug Administration (FDA), either for over the counter or prescription use. It is sold in France as cough syrup. French travelers also use it as a sleeping aid for long flights.
