= Belén Garijo =

Spanish business executive (born 1960)

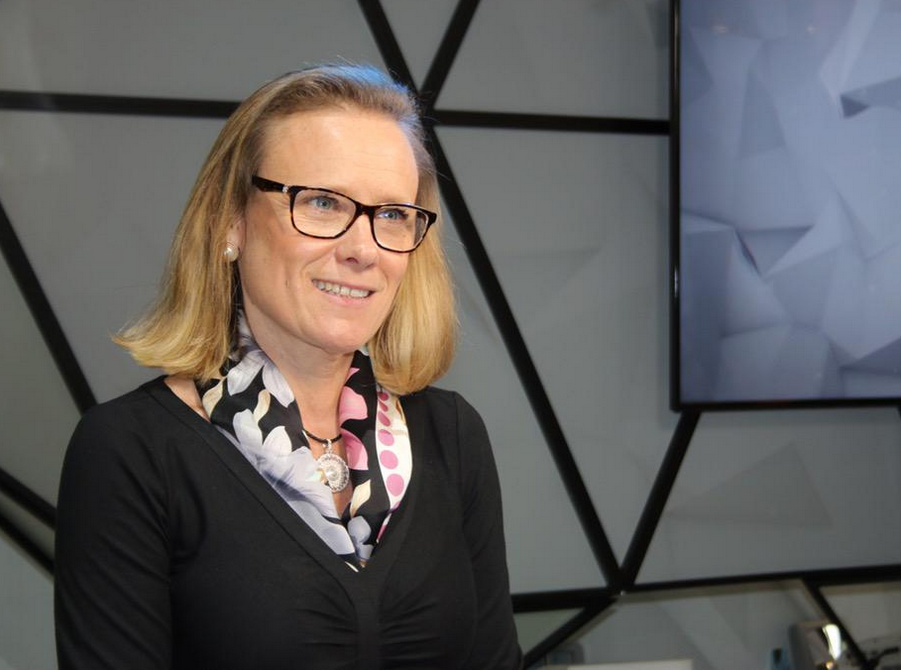
Belén Garijo

Belén Garijo (born 31 July 1960) is a Spanish business executive and the Chief Executive Officer (CEO) of Sanofi, since 1 May 2026.

== Early life ==
Garijo was born on 31 July 1960 in Almansa, Spain. She graduated from the University of Alcalá in 1983 with a degree in medicine.

== Career ==
=== Early beginnings ===
Garijo was a physician at Hospital Universitario La Paz.

In 2003, Garijo became managing director of Aventis Spain, leading the merger with Sanofi. Over the course of 15 years at Sanofi, she was vice president of pharmaceutical operations for Europe and Canada and a member of the executive committee.

=== Merck, 2011–2026 ===
In 2011, Garijo became chief operating officer of Merck Group, until being promoted to president in 2013 and elected a board member in 2015. In May 2021, she was named chief executive officer of Merck, following Stefan Oschmann. At the time, she was the first woman to head a company listed in Germany's stock market index DAX; she also became one of the top earners among the executives of DAX companies.

As Merck CEO, Garijo oversaw strategic acquisitions such as biopharmaceutical company SpringWorks Therapeutics and portfolio divestitures. Also in her capacity as CEO, she accompanied Chancellor Olaf Scholz on state visits to China in 2022 and 2024.

=== Sanofi, 2026– ===
On 11 February 2026, it was announced Garijo will become CEO of Sanofi in late April 2026. On 29 April 2026, she was formally appointed chief executive officer of Sanofi, succeeding Paul Hudson, following the company's annual general meeting. She assumed her duties on 1 May 2026.

== Other activities ==
=== Corporate boards ===
- BBVA, Member of the Board of Directors (since 2012)
- L'Oréal, Member of the Board of Directors (2014–2024)

=== Non-profit organizations ===
- European Innovation Council, Member of the Board (since 2025)

== Recognition ==
Garijo has been included in the list of "World's 100 most powerful women" by Forbes in 2023 (68th rank in 2023). She was ranked 30th on Fortune's list of Most Powerful Women in 2023.

== Personal life ==
Garijo is married to a urology specialist, with whom she has two daughters.
