= Olivier Brandicourt =

French businessman (born 13 February 1956)

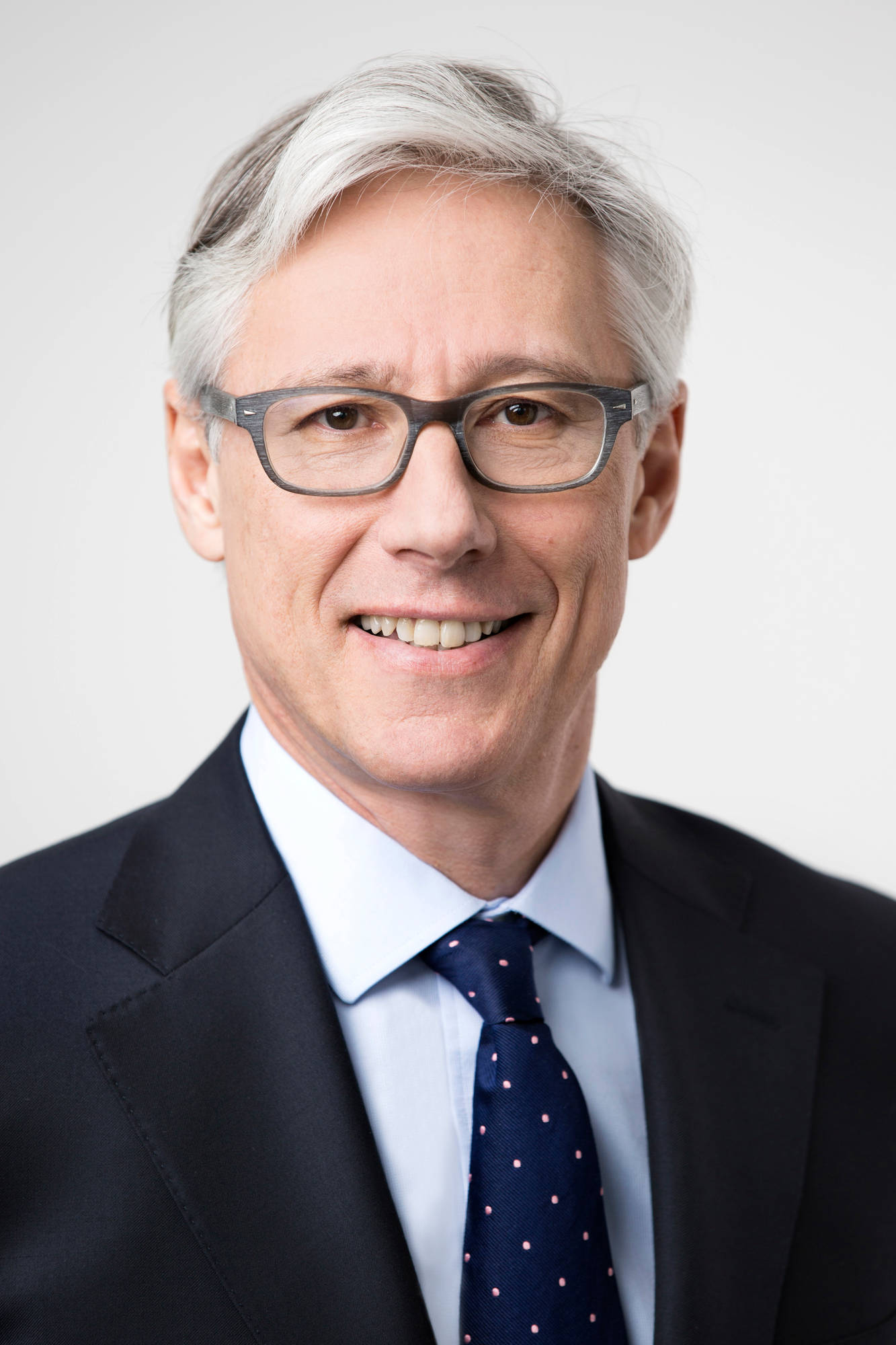
- Brandicourt in November 2013
- Born: 13 February 1956 (age 70); Casablanca, Morocco
- Education: Paris Descartes University; University of Paris XII
- Occupation: Business executive

Olivier Brandicourt (born 13 February 1956) is a French business executive and physician, and the former chief executive officer of Sanofi.

== Early life and education ==
Brandicourt studied medicine in Paris and specialized in infectious diseases and tropical medicine. He spent eight years with the Institute of Infectious and Tropical Diseases of the Pitié-Salpêtrière Hospital in Paris, where he focused on malaria research in West and Central Africa. Prior to that, he spent two years in the Republic of the Congo as a doctor.

He holds an advanced degree in Cellular and Immunological Pathophysiology from Paris Descartes University and a master's degree in biology from University of Paris XII.

== Career ==
=== Pfizer ===
Brandicourt joined Pfizer in 2000, after its acquisition of Warner-Lambert/Parke-Davis, where he started his career, first in Medical Affairs and later in Marketing and Management. He spent 12 years at Pfizer Inc. where he held several senior positions across a range of disciplines, including President and General Manager of the Global Specialty Care and Primary Care businesses, and later as president and General Manager of the Primary Care Business Unit. He served as a member of the executive leadership team of Pfizer Inc. and oversaw the introduction of the cholesterol treatment Lipitor. In 2007, he was the supervisor of the failed launch of the Exubera.

=== Bayer ===
From 2013 to 2015, he was chief executive officer and chairman of the board of management of Bayer HealthCare AG, where he was responsible for leading the company's healthcare portfolio globally, encompassing pharmaceuticals, consumer care, animal health and medical care businesses.

=== Sanofi ===
In February 2015, Olivier Brandicourt was appointed as the chief executive officer of Sanofi. His golden handshake of US$4.5 million upon taking on the appointment was criticized by French Ministers Stéphane Le Foll and Ségolène Royal.

In November 2015, Sanofi announced its 2020 Strategic Plan that implies reshaping its activities into 3 portfolios: Diabetes, cardiovascular, and vaccines. In May 2016, Olivier Brandicourt announced a reshuffle in the company's management, in line with the 2020 Strategic Plan.

In January 2017, Sanofi completed an asset swap of its animal health business, Merial, for Boehringer's consumer healthcare business, CHC. Subsequently, Sanofi launched a fifth Global Business Unit for Consumer Health Care.

== Other tenures ==
- Member of the council of the International Federation of Pharmaceutical Manufacturers and Associations (IFPMA),
- Member of the Board of Management of the Pharmaceutical Research and Manufacturers of America (PhRMA).
- Vice-president of the European Federation of Pharmaceutical Industries and Associations (EFPIA);
- Honorary Fellow of the Royal College of Physicians in London
- Trustee of the Children's Aid Society in New York.

Business positions
Preceded by Chris Viehbacher	CEO of Sanofi; 2015–2019	Succeeded by Paul Hudson
