= Dirithromycin =

Pharmaceutical drug

Clinical data
- Trade names: Dynabac
- AHFS/Drugs.com: Micromedex Detailed Consumer Information
- MedlinePlus: a604026
- License data: US FDA: Clarithromycin
- Pregnancy category: B
- Routes of administration: Oral
- ATC code: J01FA13 (WHO)

Pharmacokinetic data
- Bioavailability: 10%
- Protein binding: 15 to 30%
- Metabolism: Hyrolized to erythromycyclamine in 1.5 hours

Identifiers
- IUPAC name: (2R,3R,6R,7S,8S,9R,10R,12R,13S,15R,17S)-9-{[(2S,3R,4S,6R)-4-(dimethylamino)-3-hydroxy-6-methyloxan-2-yl]oxy}-3-ethyl-2,10-dihydroxy-7-{[(2R,4R,5S,6S)-5-hydroxy-4-methoxy-4,6-dimethyloxan-2-yl]oxy}-15-[(2-methoxyethoxy)methyl]-2,6,8,10,12,17-hexamethyl-4,16-dioxa-14-azabicyclo[11.3.1]heptadecan-5-one
- CAS Number: 62013-04-1
- PubChem CID: 6917067
- DrugBank: DB00954
- ChemSpider: 5292341
- UNII: 1801D76STL
- KEGG: D03865
- ChEBI: CHEBI:474014
- ChEMBL: ChEMBL3039471
- CompTox Dashboard (EPA): DTXSID7048956
- ECHA InfoCard: 100.152.704

Chemical and physical data
- Formula: C_{42}H_{78}N_{2}O_{14}
- Molar mass: 835.086 g·mol^{−1}
- 3D model (JSmol): Interactive image
- Melting point: 186 to 189 °C (367 to 372 °F) (dec.)
- SMILES: O=C4O[C@@H]([C@](O)(C)[C@H]1O[C@@H](N[C@H]([C@@H]1C)[C@H](C)C[C@](O)(C)[C@H](O[C@@H]2O[C@H](C)C[C@H](N(C)C)[C@H]2O)[C@H]([C@H](O[C@@H]3O[C@@H](C)[C@H](O)[C@@](OC)(C)C3)[C@H]4C)C)COCCOC)CC
- InChI: InChI=1S/C42H78N2O14/c1-15-29-42(10,49)37-24(4)32(43-30(56-37)21-52-17-16-50-13)22(2)19-40(8,48)36(58-39-33(45)28(44(11)12)18-23(3)53-39)25(5)34(26(6)38(47)55-29)57-31-20-41(9,51-14)35(46)27(7)54-31/h22-37,39,43,45-46,48-49H,15-21H2,1-14H3/t22-,23-,24+,25+,26-,27+,28+,29-,30-,31+,32+,33-,34+,35+,36-,37+,39+,40-,41-,42-/m1/s1; Key:WLOHNSSYAXHWNR-NXPDYKKBSA-N

Dirithromycin is a macrolide glycopeptide antibiotic.

Dirithromycin (Dynabac) is a more lipid-soluble prodrug derivative of 9S-erythromycyclamine prepared by condensation of the latter with 2-(2-methoxyethoxy)acetaldehyde. The 9N, 11O-oxazine ring thus formed is a hemi-aminal that is unstable under both acidic and alkaline aqueous conditions and undergoes spontaneous hydrolysis to form erythromycyclamine. Erythromycyclamine is a semisynthetic derivative of erythromycin in which the 9-ketogroup of the erythronolide ring has been converted to an amino group. Erythromycyclamine retains the antibacterial properties of erythromycin oral administration. The prodrug, dirithromycin, is provided as enteric coated tablets to protect it from acid catalyzed hydrolysis in the stomach. Orally administered dirithromycin is absorbed rapidly into the plasma, largely from the small intestine. Spontaneous hydrolysis to erythromycyclamine occurs in the plasma. Oral bioavailability is estimated to be about 10%, but food does not affect absorption of the prodrug.

== Discontinuation ==
Dirithromycin is no longer available in the United States. Since the production of dirithromycin is discontinued in the U.S., National Institutes of Health recommend that people taking dirithromycin should consult their physicians to discuss switching to another treatment. However, dirithromycin is still available in many European countries.
