= Gold Bond =

Brand of skin care products

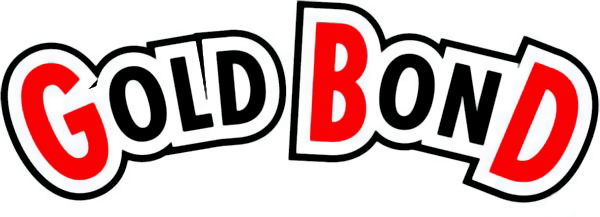
- Inventor: Rhode Island State Medical Association
- Inception: Developed 1882; 144 years ago Launched 1908; 118 years ago
- Available: Available
- Current supplier: Chattem
- Website: www.goldbond.com

Gold Bond is a brand of over-the-counter skin care products produced by Chattem of Chattanooga, Tennessee, now a subsidiary of the French pharmaceutical company Sanofi. It is available as both a powder and a topical cream. Gold Bond is used to curb moisture, control odor, and soothe minor skin irritations, notably jock itch. Spin-off products are designed for specific uses, such as foot powders or powders for infants to treat diaper rash.

== Ingredients ==
The active ingredient of Original Strength Gold Bond Powder is menthol. Inactive ingredients include corn starch and zinc oxide. The product formerly contained talc.

== History ==
The history of Gold Bond dates to 1882, when it was first developed by physicians of the Rhode Island State Medical Association. The formula was purchased by Arthur W. Guilford in 1908, who established the Gold Bond name and began making the product in Fairhaven, Massachusetts. The formula and rights were sold in 1912 to John M. Chapman of New Bedford, Massachusetts, who achieved greater brand recognition and distribution. Timothy F. Shea, who in 1930 joined what was then "The Gold Bond Sterilizing Powder Company", eventually rose to general manager and treasurer, and later took over as sole owner. His son, Robert J. Shea, took over as president of the company in 1965.

The Gold Bond company sold rights to three of its brands, including Gold Bond Powder, to Block Drug Corporation in August 1987. The brand was then sold to Martin Himmel Inc. in March 1990. To this point, the brand had remained a regional product of New England; soon after its purchase, Himmel began a national marketing campaign which saw sales increase by over 70% annually. By 1995, Gold Bond was a US$27 million business, and was sold to Chattem in April 1996 for $40 million.
