= Dulcolax =

Dulcolax may refer to:

- Dulcolax, a trade name of bisacodyl, a stimulant laxative drug that increases bowel movement
- Dulcolax Balance, a trade name of macrogol, an osmotic laxative
- Dulcolax Stool Softener, a trade name of dioctyl sodium sulfosuccinate, a common ingredient in products such as laxatives
- Dulcolax SP Drops, a trade name of sodium picosulfate, a stimulant laxative drug.
