= Sanofi =

French multinational pharmaceutical and healthcare company

Sanofi S.A.
- Formerly: Sanofi-Synthélabo (1999–2004); Sanofi-Aventis (2004–2011)
- Type: Public
- Traded as: Euronext Paris: SAN; Nasdaq: SNY; CAC 40 component
- ISIN: FR0000120578
- Industry: Pharmaceuticals; Biotechnology; Healthcare
- Founded: 15 February 1973; 53 years ago
- Headquarters: Paris, France
- Area served: Worldwide
- Key people: Frédéric Oudéa (chairman); Belén Garijo ( CEO)
- Products: Medications, generic drugs, over-the-counter drugs, vaccines, diagnostics, contact lenses, animal health (list...)
- Revenue: ▲€43.62 billion (2025)
- Operating income: ▼€6.34 billion (2025)
- Net income: ▲€7.85 billion (2025)
- Total assets: ▼€126.80 billion (2025)
- Total equity: ▼€71.71 billion (2025)
- Number of employees: 82,878 (2024)
- Subsidiaries: Sanofi Pasteur; Genzyme; Shantha Biotechnics; Chattem; Ablynx; Bioverativ; Opella
- Website: sanofi.com

Sanofi S.A. is a French multinational pharmaceutical and healthcare company headquartered in Paris. The corporation was established in 1973 and merged with Synthélabo in 1999 to form Sanofi-Synthélabo. In 2004, Sanofi-Synthélabo merged with Aventis and renamed to Sanofi-Aventis, which were each the product of several previous mergers. It changed its name back to Sanofi in May 2011. The company trades as "SAN" on Euronext Paris and "SNY" on Nasdaq in the United States, and is a component of the Euro Stoxx 50 stock market index. In 2023, the company was ranked 89th in the Forbes Global 2000.

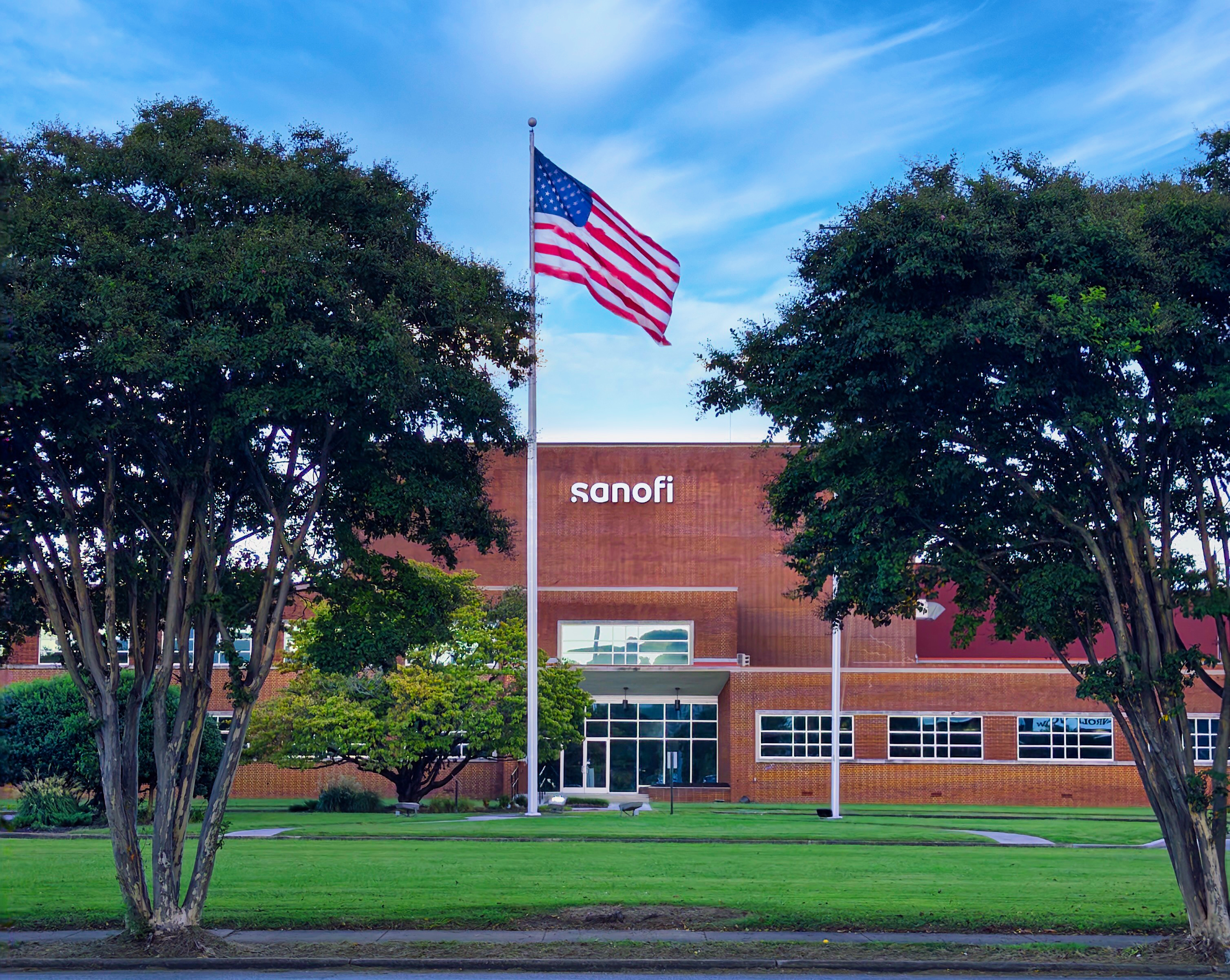
A Sanofi plant in Chattanooga, Tennessee

Sanofi engages in the research and development, manufacturing, and marketing of pharmacological products, principally in the prescription market, but the firm also develops over-the-counter medications. The corporation covers seven major therapeutic areas: cardiovascular, central nervous system, diabetes, internal medicine, oncology, thrombosis, and vaccines. It is one of the world's largest producer of vaccines through its subsidiary Sanofi Pasteur.

== History ==
=== Sanofi-Synthélabo ===
Sanofi was founded on February 15, 1973 as a subsidiary of Elf Aquitaine (a French oil company subsequently acquired by Total), when Elf Aquitaine took control of the Labaz group, a pharmaceutical company formed in 1947 by Sociéte Belge de l'Azote et des Produits Chimiques du Marly. Labaz had developed benziodarone in 1957.

In 1993, Sanofi made a move into the Central and Eastern European market by acquiring a controlling interest in Chinoin, a Hungarian drug company whose 1992, sales totaled about US$104 million. In the same year, Sanofi made its first significant venture into the US, and strengthened its presence in Central and Eastern Europe, by first partnering with Sterling Winthrop and then acquiring the prescription pharmaceuticals business in 1994. Sanofi was incorporated under the laws of France in 1994, as a société anonyme, a form of limited liability company.

Synthélabo was founded in 1970, through the merger of two French pharmaceutical laboratories, Laboratoires Dausse (founded in 1834) and Laboratoires Robert & Carrière (founded in 1899). In 1973, the French cosmetics group L'Oréal acquired the majority of its share capital. In 1991, Synthelabo acquired Laboratories Delalande and Laboratoires Delagrange and, as a result of that deal, picked up the product metoclopramide.

Logo for Sanofi-Synthélabo (1999—2004)

Sanofi-Synthélabo was formed in 1999 when Sanofi merged with Synthélabo. At the time of the merger, Sanofi was the second largest pharmaceutical group in France in terms of sales and Synthélabo was the third largest. The merged company was based in Paris, France.

The merged companies focused on pharmaceuticals, divesting several businesses soon after the merger, including beauty, diagnostics, animal health and nutrition, custom chemicals, and two medical equipment businesses.

=== Aventis ===
Aventis was formed in 1999, when the French company Rhône-Poulenc S.A. merged with the German corporation Hoechst Marion Roussel, which itself was formed from the 1995 merger of Hoechst AG with Cassella, Roussel Uclaf, and Marion Merrell Dow. Hoechst AG, the majority partner at the time in Hoechst Marion Roussel, was itself a merger of two of the three forcibly separated subsidiaries of IG Farben, exploiter of Auschwitz slave labor and supplier of Zyklon B during The Holocaust. The merged company was based in Schiltigheim, near Strasbourg, France.

At the time of the merger, Rhône-Poulenc's business included the pharmaceutical businesses Rorer, Centeon (blood products), and Pasteur Merieux (vaccines), the plant and animal health businesses Rhône-Poulenc Agro, Rhône-Poulenc Animal Nutrition, and Merial, and a 67 percent share in Rhodia, a specialty chemicals company. Hoechst, one of the companies that resulted from the post-WWII split of IG Farben, had seven primary businesses: Hoechst Marion Roussel (pharmaceuticals), AgrEvo (a joint venture with Schering in crop protection agents and pest control products), HR Vet (veterinary products), Dade Behring (diagnostics), Centeon, Celanese (chemicals), and Messer (chemicals). Merieux has been in the business of selling blood products, and in the 1980s, during the AIDS epidemic, Merieux and other companies were involved in scandals related to HIV-contaminated haemophilia blood products that were sold to developing nations.

In 2000, Aventis and Millennium Pharmaceuticals, a US biotechnology company formed to discover new drugs based on the then-new science of genomics, announced that Aventis would make a $250M investment in Millennium and would pay $200M to Millennium in research fees over five years, one of the largest such deals between a big pharmaceutical company and a biotech company at the time.

In late 2000, in the midst of the recall of Starlink, its genetically modified maize product, Aventis announced that it had determined to sell off Aventis Cropscience, the seed and pesticide business unit it had created from the agriculture businesses of its predecessors. In October 2001, Bayer and Aventis announced that Bayer would acquire the unit for about $6.6 billion; the unit became Bayer CropScience, making Bayer the world's second-largest agrochemical company behind Syngenta.

In 2003, Aventis entered into a collaboration with Regeneron Pharmaceuticals, a New York biotechnology company, to develop Regeneron's VEGF-inhibiting drug, aflibercept, which was then in Phase I clinical trials. Aventis invested $45 million in Regeneron and made an upfront payment of $80 million in cash. Regeneron partnered the use of the drug with Bayer Healthcare in the field of proliferative eye diseases, and under the name Eylea it was approved by the US Food and Drug Administration (FDA) in 2011; after several setbacks in clinical trials, Regeneron and Sanofi got the drug approved for metastatic colorectal cancer in combination with other agents, under the brand name Zaltrap in 2012.

==== Sanofi-Aventis merger ====
Sanofi-Aventis was formed in 2004, when Sanofi-Synthélabo acquired Aventis. In early 2004, Sanofi-Synthélabo made a hostile takeover bid for Aventis worth €47.8 billion. Initially, Aventis rejected the bid because it felt that the bid offered inferior value based on the company's share value, and the board of Aventis went so far as to enact poison pill provisions and to invite Novartis to enter merger negotiations. The three-month takeover battle concluded when Sanofi-Synthélabo launched a friendly bid of €54.5 billion in place of the previously rejected hostile bid. The French government played a strong role, desiring what it called a "local solution", by putting heavy pressure on Sanofi-Synthélabo to raise its bid for Aventis and for Aventis to accept the offer and by rejecting Aventis's poison pill proposal. One of the largest risks in the deal for both sides was the fate of the patents protecting Clopidogrel (Plavix), which was one of the top-selling drugs in the world at the time and the major source of Sanofi's revenue.

=== Post-merger activities ===
In 2006, Iraqis infected with HIV sued Sanofi and Baxter over HIV-contaminated haemophilia blood products sold by Merieux in the 1980s. In 2006, the US patents on clopidogrel (Plavix) were challenged when a Canadian generics company, Apotex, filed an Abbreviated New Drug Application under the Hatch-Waxman Act, received FDA approval, and started marketing a generic formulation of clopidogrel. While Sanofi-Aventis and its partner in the drug, Bristol Myers Squibb (BMS), were able to get an injunction to stop Apotex from selling it, the case became complicated when settlement negotiations fell apart twice – the second time because of an oral agreement made by BMS CEO Peter Dolan that BMS failed to disclose to the Federal Trade Commission during the review of the settlement agreement to ensure that it did not violate antitrust law. When Apotex disclosed the oral agreement to the FTC, the FTC launched an investigation that led to Dolan's dismissal by BMS. Apotex finally lost on the patent litigation issues after its third appeal was decided in favor of BMS/Sanofi in November 2011; Apotex had to pay ~$442 million in damages and ~$108 million in interest for infringing the patent, which it paid in full by February 2012. Apotex also sued BMS and Sanofi for $3.4 billion for allegedly breaching the settlement agreement; Apotex lost a jury trial in March 2013.

In 2007, Sanofi-Aventis expanded on Aventis's prior relationship with Regeneron Pharmaceuticals; in the new deal Sanofi-Aventis agreed to pay Regeneron $100 million per year for five years, under which Regeneron would use its monoclonal antibody discovery platform to create new biopharmaceuticals, to which Sanofi-Aventis gained the exclusive right to co-develop. In 2009, the companies expanded the deal to $160 million per year and extended it to 2017. As of 2009, the collaboration had four antibodies in clinical development and had filed an IND for a fifth. Two were against undisclosed targets, one targeted the interleukin-6 receptor as a treatment for rheumatoid arthritis, another targeted nerve growth factor for the treatment of pain, and another targeted delta-like ligand 4 as a cancer treatment.

Between 2008, when Chris Viehbacher was hired as CEO, and 2010, the company spent more than $17 billion in mergers and acquisitions to strengthen its consumer healthcare and generics platforms, especially in emerging markets, in the face of looming patent cliffs and the growth of the consumer healthcare segment. In September, Zentiva was acquired for €1.8 billion, expanding the group's presence in eastern European markets.

In 2009, Medley Farma, the third largest pharmaceutical company in Brazil and a leading generics company there, was acquired for about $635 million. Sanofi outbid Teva Pharmaceuticals. The deal was approved by Brazil's antitrust authorities in May 2010. Later that year, Indian vaccine manufacturer Shantha Biotechnics was acquired for $784 million. In October Sanofi-Aventis announced that it would lay off about 1700 US employees (about 25% of its US workforce) because of restructuring triggered by growing generic competition and other factors, and that the company would focus its US operations on diabetes, atrial fibrillation, and oncology.

In 2010, US consumer healthcare company Chattem, Inc. was acquired for around $1.9 billion. In the same year, Nepentes Pharma was acquired for $130 million and BMP Sunstone Corporation for $520.6 million.

=== Name change, acquisitions and investments ===
The company dropped the -Aventis suffix of its name on May 6, 2011, after receiving approval at its annual general meeting. The reason given by the company for the change was to make its name easier to pronounce in countries such as China.

In 2011, Genzyme Corporation was acquired for around $20.1 billion. This biotechnology company, headquartered in Cambridge, Massachusetts, specializes in the treatment of orphan diseases, renal diseases, endocrinology, oncology, and biosurgery.

In January 2012, Sanofi co-invested in the $125 million Series A financing of Warp Drive Bio. Sanofi sought support for its internal cancer research program and also took on an obligation to acquire Warp Drive if certain milestones were met.

In January 2014, Genzyme and Alnylam Pharmaceuticals, a US biotechnology company developing RNAi therapeutics, announced that Genyzme would invest $700 million in Alnylam. Under the deal, Genzyme obtained further rights to patisiran, an RNAi treatment for transthyretin-mediated amyloidosis – a condition that can result in familial amyloidotic polyneuropathy and familial amyloidotic cardiomyopathy and obtained rights to other compounds in Alnylam's pipeline.

In March 2014, Sanofi joined the bidding for Merck & Co.'s over-the-counter health-products unit, the maker of Coppertone sunblock and the antihistamine Claritin; bids were expected to range between $10 billion and $12 billion.

In October 2014, Sanofi's directors fired US-resident chief executive Chris Viehbacher, blaming his alleged lack of communication with the board and poor execution of his strategy. Board chairperson Serge Weinberg took over as interim CEO until 2 April 2015 when Bayer Healthcare board chairman Olivier Brandicourt (appointed by Sanofi on 19 February 2015) took over. Before Brandicourt even started his new job, French government ministers Stéphane Le Foll and Ségolène Royal attacked the $4.5 million golden handshake he was getting from Sanofi – and his pay of about $4.7 million a year. Furthermore, in 2014, the business took a 66% stake in Globalpharma, a Dubai-based generics manufacturer.

In July 2015, Genzyme announced that it would acquire the cancer drug Caprelsa (vandetanib) from AstraZeneca for up to $300 million. In the same month, the company announced a new global collaboration with Regeneron Pharmaceuticals to discover, develop, and commercialize new immuno-oncology drugs, which could generate more than $2 billion for Regeneron, with $640 million upfront, $750 million for proof of concept data, and $650 million from the development of REGN2810.

In June 2016, the company announced that it had struck an asset-swap deal with Boehringer Ingelheim. Sanofi would sell its Merial animal health division (valuing it at €11.4 billion), while acquiring Boehringer's consumer health division (valuing it at €6.7 billion) and €4.7 billion in cash. The deal meant that Sanofi was now one of the global consumer healthcare leaders by market share.

In July 2017, the company announced its intention to acquire Protein Sciences, a privately held Connecticut-based vaccines biotechnology company, for $650 million and with up to $100 million in milestone achievements.

In January 2018, Sanofi announced that it would acquire Bioverativ for $11.6 billion and days later announced that it would acquire Ablynx for €3.9 billion ($4.8 billion).

In December 2019, the company announced that it would acquire Synthorx for $2.5 billion ($68 per share), adding the lead product candidate THOR-707 (SAR444245), a form of interleukin-2 (IL-2) being developed for use against multiple solid tumors. In October 2022, Sanofi announced that it had stopped Phase 2 studies of THOR-707 (SAR444245) because the drug's efficacy “was lower than projected”. Sanofi would take a roughly $1.6 billion impairment charge because of delays to the program.

In May 2020, Regeneron announced that it would repurchase around $5 billion of its shares held directly by Sanofi. Before the transaction, Sanofi had held 23.2 million Regeneron shares. In June, the company announced that it had agreed a potential $2 billion deal with Translate Bio, expanding an already existing collaboration for COVID-19 treatments. The company agreed to produce 60 million doses of a coronavirus vaccine for the United Kingdom government in July 2020. It used recombinant protein-based technology for Sanofi's flu vaccine along with GSK's pandemic technology and was seeking regulatory approval by the first half of 2021. Sanofi also agreed to a $2.1 billion deal with the United States for 100 million doses. In August, Sanofi announced that it would acquire Principia Biopharma for $3.7 billion, acquiring its BTK inhibitor program. The acquisition was completed in September 2020. In November, Sanofi announced that it would acquire Kiadis Pharma for €308 million (around $359 million, or €5.45 per share), expanding its immuno-oncology pipeline with the acquisition of Kiadis's three clinical compounds: K-NK002 in Phase II trials for hematopoietic stem cell transplants in blood cancer, K-NK003 for relapsed or refractory acute myeloid leukemia, and K-NK-ID101 for COVID-19.

Sanofi campus at Cambridge Crossing

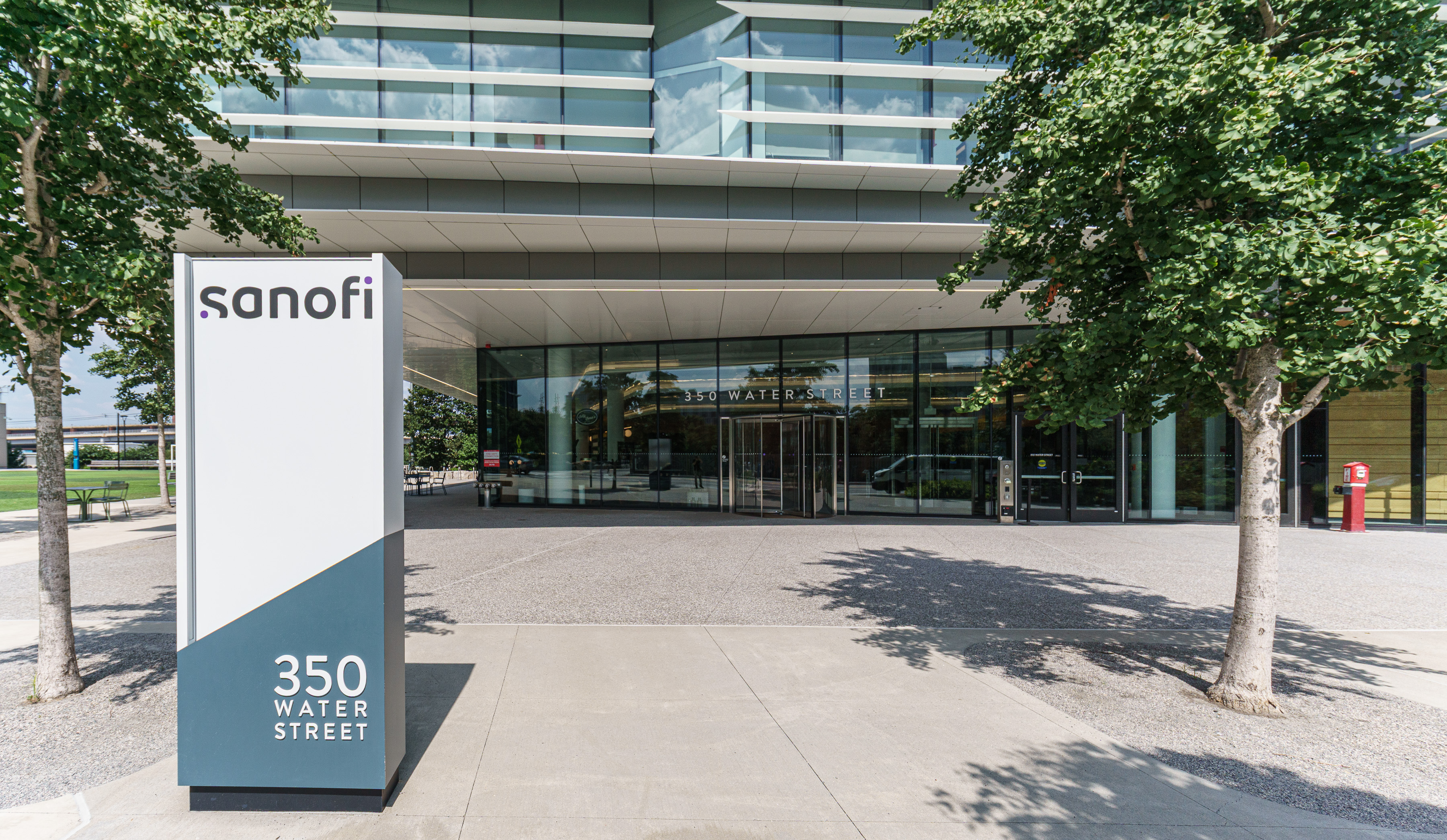
350 Water Street

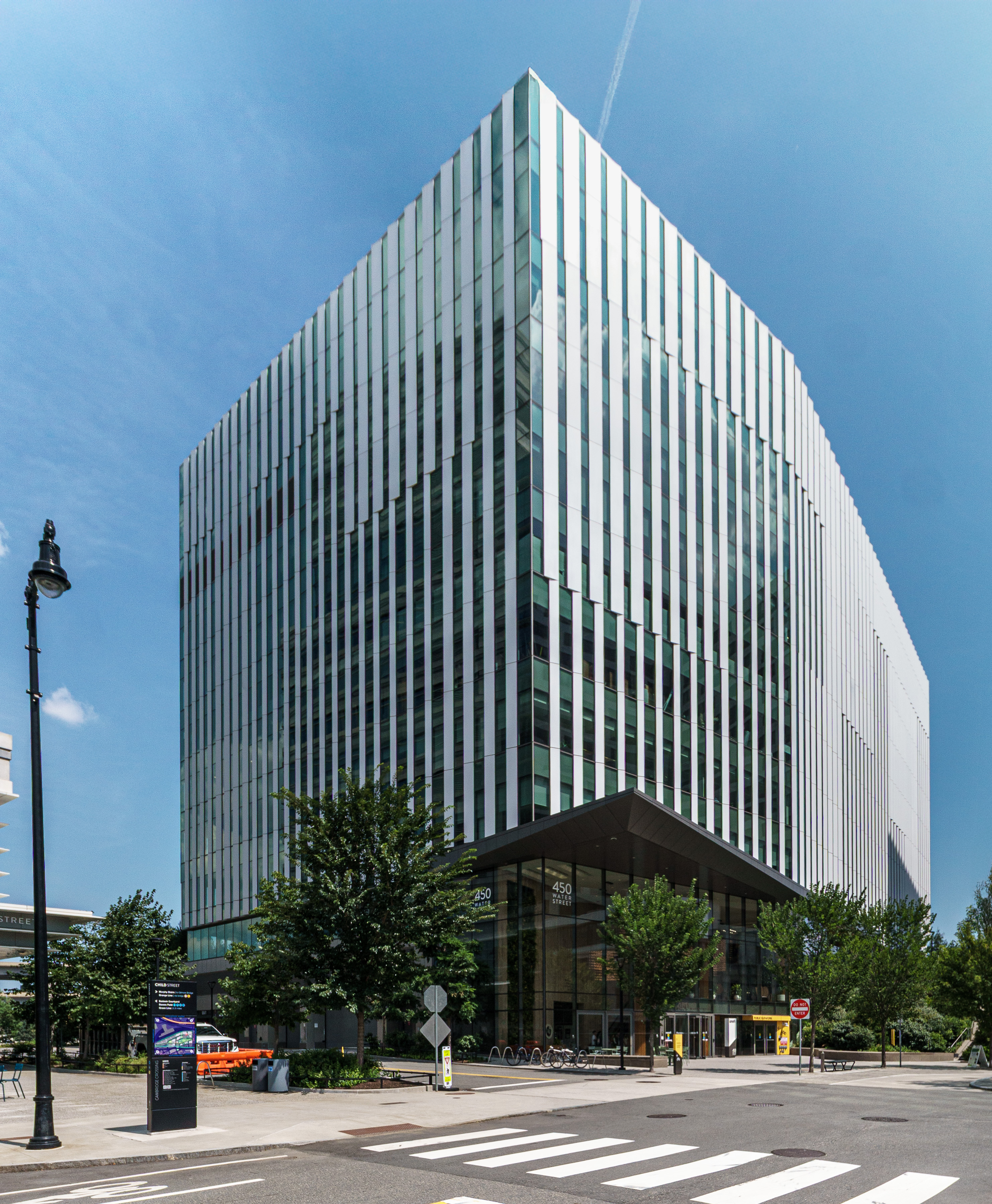
450 Water Street

In January 2021, Sanofi announced that it would buy the British biotech Kymab Ltd and its potential first-in-class drug candidate – KY1005 –- for $1.45 billion. In April, the business announced that it would acquire Tidal Therapeutics for up to $470m. in August the company announced that it would acquire Translate Bio and its mRNA vaccine technology for $3.2 billion. On 8 September 2021, Sanofi announced that it would acquire US biotech company Kadmon Corporation for $1.9 billion On 18 November 2021, it was reported that Sanofi would be investing $180 million in French startup Owkin, whose predictive algorithms aim to improve the research and development of new cures against cancer. In December, the company announced that it would acquire Origimm Biotechnology GmbH and its acne vaccine candidate (ORI-001), as well as Amunix Pharmaceuticals, for an initial $1 billion plus potentially $200 million in additional milestones.

In April 2022, Sanofi broke ground on its biggest industrial investment, a $638m vaccine and enzymes production facility in Tuas, Singapore, targeted for completion in 2025.

In June 2022, Sanofi opened a 900,000 square foot campus at Cambridge Crossing in Cambridge, Massachusetts. The campus consists of two buildings at 350 and 450 Water Street.

In March 2023, the company announced it would acquire Provention Bio and its type 1 diabetes therapy pipeline.

In the fall of 2023, Sanofi announced plans to separate the OTC and focus on its key prescription production, increasing investment and reducing costs. The most likely way to separate a non-prescription division (about 11,000 employees, 2023 revenue — over $4 billion) is to create a public company headquartered in France. The division is planned for the fourth quarter of 2024.

In December 2023, the company has signed a 140 million dollars partnership with Aqemia, a company that solves a mathematical equation that eliminates the need for heavy computing facilities with large computing power.

In January 2024, Sanofi announced that it had agreed to buy a U.S. biotech firm Inhibrx for up to $2.2 billion, with a focus on obtaining Inhibrx's INBRX-101, an experimental treatment for Alpha-1 Antitrypsin Deficiency (AATD), an inherited rare disease that causes progressive deterioration of the lung tissue. The post-acquisition company now employs more than 90,000 employees in 90 countries.

In October 2024, Sanofi and CD&R entered exclusive negotiations to transfer a 50% controlling stake in Opella with Sanofi to remain a significant shareholder.

In May 2025, Sanofi announced the buyout of Vigil Neuroscience for $470 million.

In December 2025, it was announced that Sanofi had agreed to acquire the Emeryville, California-based company, Dynavax Technologies in an all-cash transaction valued at approximately US$2.2 billion. The acquisition, which is expected to close in the first quarter of 2026 subject to regulatory approvals, adds Dynavax’s approved and development-stage vaccine assets to Sanofi’s vaccines portfolio.

=== Company financials ===
Historical financial data (in billions of euro)
Year	2001	2002	2003	2004	2005	2006	2007	2008	2009	2010	2011	2012	2013	2014	2015	2016	2017	2018	2019	2023
Revenue	6.069	7.448	8.048	14.87	27.31	28.37	28.05	27.57	29.31	30.38	33.39	34.95	30.97	31.69	34.54	33.82	35.07	34.46	36.13	43.07
Net Income	1.098	1.640	1.865	-3.665	2.202	4.006	5.263	3.851	5.265	5.467	5.646	4.888	3.716	4.390	4.287	4.800	8.42	4.31	2.81	5.43
Assets	18.23	17.36	17.42	82.85	86.24	77.76	71.91	71.99	80.25	85.26	100.7	100.4	96.06	97.39	102.3	104.7	99.81	111.41	112.74	126.4
Equity	12.75	12.60	12.74	41.63	46.40	45.60	44.54	44.87	48.32	53.10	56.19	57.35	56.9	56.12	58.05	57.72	58.07	58.88	58.93	74.35

Note. In 2001–2004: Sanofi-Synthélabo; in 2004–2011: Sanofi-Aventis.

=== Acquisition history ===
Sanofi Acquisitions
- Sanofi
  - Sanofi–Aventis
    - Aventis (Merged 2004)
      - Rhône-Poulenc (Merged 1999)
        - A. Nattermann (Acq 1986)
        - William H. Rorer, Inc. (Merged 1990)
        - Centeon
        - Pasteur Merieux
        - Rhône-Poulenc Agro
        - Rhône-Poulenc Animal Nutrition
        - Merial (Sold to Boehringer Ingelheim 2016)
        - Rhodia
      - Hoechst Marion Roussel (Merged 1999)
        - AgrEvo
        - HR Vet
        - Dade Behring
        - Centeon
        - Celanese
        - Messer
        - Roussel Uclaf (Acq 1997)
    - Sanofi-Synthélabo (Merged 2004)
      - Sanofi (Est 1973 as subsidiary of Elf Aquitaine)
        - Midy
        - Sterling Winthrop (Acq 1994)
      - Synthélabo
        - Laboratoires Dausse (Founded 1834, merged 1970)
        - Robert & Carrière (Founded 1899, merged 1970)
    - Zentiva (Acq 2008)
      - Leciva Slovakofarma (Acq 2003)
      - Sicomed SA Bucharest (Acq 2005)
    - Medley Farma (Acq 2009)
    - Shantha Biotechnics (Acq 2009)
    - Chattem (Acq 2010)
    - Nepentes Pharma (Acq 2010)
    - BMP Sunstone Corporation (Acq 2010)
  - Genzyme Corporation (Acq 2011)
    - Whatman Biochemicals Ltd (Acq 1981)
    - Koch-Light Laboratories (Acq 1982)
    - Integrated Genetics (Acq 1989, spun off 1991)
    - Genecore International (Diagnostic enzyme div, acq 1991)
    - Medix Biotech, Inc. (Acq 1992)
    - Enzymatix Ltd (Acq 1992)
    - Vivigen (Acq 1992)
    - Virotech (Acq 1993)
    - Omni Res srl (Acq 1993)
    - Sygena Ltd (Acq 1994)
    - BioSurface Technology Inc. (Acq 1994)
    - TSI Inc. (Acq 1994)
    - PharmaGenics, Inc. (Acq 1997)
    - Biomatrix (Acq 2000)
    - SangStat Medical Corp. (Acq 2003)
    - Ilex Oncology Inc. (Acq 2004)
    - Bone Care International Inc. (Acq 2005)
    - AnorMED Inc. (Acq 2006)
    - Bioenvision (Acq 2007)
  - Protein Sciences (Acq 2017)
  - Bioverativ (Acq 2018)
    - True North Therapeutics (Acq 2017)
  - Ablynx (Acq 2018)
  - Synthorx (Acq 2019)
  - Principia Biopharma (Acq 2020)
  - Kiadis Pharma (Acq 2020)
  - Kymab Ltd (Acq 2021)
  - Tidal Therapeutics (Acq 2021)
  - Translate Bio (Acq 2021)
  - Kadmon Corporation (Acq 2021)
  - Origimm Biotechnology GmbH (Acq 2021)
  - Amunix Pharmaceuticals (Acq 2021)
  - Provention Bio (Acq 2023)
  - Inhibrx (Acq 2024)
  - Vigil Neuroscience (Acq 2025)

== Products ==
The following products are listed on the Sanofi Genzyme website. Generic drug names are given in parentheses following the brand name.

– Autoimmune

- Aubagio (Teriflunomide), small molecule for multiple sclerosis. Approved by the FDA in September 2012.
- Auvi-Q (Epinephrine autoinjector), licensed from Intelliject and approved by the FDA in 2012, for emergency treatment of life-threatening allergic reactions.

Product recall and effects: The epinephrine (adrenaline) auto-injection devices made by Sanofi SA currently on the market in the US and Canada were voluntarily recalled on 28 October 2015. The reason given by Sanofi was that the products had been found to potentially have inaccurate dosage delivery systems, which might include failure to deliver the drugs.

Sanofi US also added the following warning: If a patient experiencing a serious allergic reaction (i.e., anaphylaxis) did not receive the intended dose, there could be significant health consequences, including death, because anaphylaxis is a potentially life‑threatening condition.

In its news release on 28 October 2015, Sanofi Canada stated that it was "actively working with suppliers of alternative epinephrine auto-injectors to have a full stock available in Canada as soon as possible. Canadian customers were asked to immediately return the Allerject product to their local pharmacy to obtain an alternate epinephrine auto-injector."

The US Food and Drug Administration (FDA) also filed a news release, confirming that the recall involved all Auvi-Q currently on the market in the United States. The FDA release went on to provide information for consumers re: exchanging the device for another brand of product, also provided on the Auvi-Q web site. Sanofi US would provide reimbursement for out of pocket costs incurred for the purchase of new, alternate epinephrine auto-injectors with proof of purchase.

The alternate products expected to most commonly replace the recalled Sanofi devices were the EpiPens made by Mylan in the US and by Pfizer—under license from Mylan—in Canada. Mylan already had an 85% market share of the auto-injectors in the USA in the first half of 2015. Maylan was expected to benefit from the recall by its competitor Sanofi, according to a report published in the Fierce Pharma newsletter of 2 November 2015. As Bernstein analyst Ronny Gal wrote in a note to clients,"....it is very hard to see Auvi-Q returning to the market, as it will need to be redesigned and face uphill battle to recapture patient trust after the recall." Gal also believed that the company would eventually have 95% of the epinephrine auto-injector market, according to another Fierce Pharma report on 3 November 2015.

– Cardiovascular

- Adenoscan (Adenosine), for arrhythmias, marketed by Astellas.
- Altace (Ramipril), for hypertension, marketed by Pfizer.
- Arixtra (Fondaparinux), for thrombosis, marketed by GlaxoSmithKline and now owned by Mylan.
- Avalide (Irbesartan), for hypertension, marketed by Bristol-Myers Squibb.
- Avapro (Irbesartan), for hypertension, marketed by Bristol-Myers Squibb.
- Cardizem (Diltiazem), for hypertension, Now owned by Bausch Health.
- Cholestagel (Colesevelam), for low-calorie diet and exercise.
- Cordarone (Amiodarone), for heart rhythm problems.
- Iprivask (Desirudin), for atherothrombosis, Now owned by Bausch Health.
- Kynamro (Mipomersen), an antisense drug invented by Isis Pharmaceuticals and acquired by Genzyme in 2008, (pre-Sanofi) and approved by the FDA in 2013, for the orphan disease homozygous familial hypercholesterolemia.
- Lasix (Furosemide), for edema.
- Lovenox (Enoxaparin), for thrombosis, (its biggest seller in 2008).
- Multaq (Dronedarone), for cardiac arrhythmias.
- Nitrolingual (Nitroglycerin), for chest pain and angina, marketed by G. Pohl-Boskamp GmbH & Co.
- Plavix (Clopidogrel), for atherothrombosis, marketed by Bristol-Myers Squibb.
- Praluent (Alirocumab), for heterozygous familial hypercholesterolemia and clinical atherosclerotic cardiovascular disease, marketed by Regeneron.
- Ranexa (Ranolazine), for stable angina, marketed by Gilead Sciences.

– Dermatology

- Dupixent (Dupilumab), for eczema, marketed by Regeneron.
- Dynabac (Dirithromycin), for acute bacteria exacerbations.
- Sklice (Ivermectin), for head lice, now owned by Arbor Pharmaceuticals.

– Diabetes

- Adlyxin (Lixisenatide), for type 2 diabetes mellitus.
- Admelog (insulin lispro), for type 1 and type 2 diabetes mellitus.
- Afrezza (Inhalable insulin), for type 1 and type 2 diabetes mellitus.
- Amaryl (Glimepiride), for type 2 diabetes mellitus.
- Apidra (insulin glulisine), for type 1 and type 2 diabetes mellitus.
- Diabeta (Glyburide), for type 2 diabetes mellitus.
- Glucophage (Metformin), for type 2 diabetes mellitus, marketed by EMD Serono.
- Insuman (Human insulin), for type 1 and type 2 diabetes mellitus.
- Lantus (insulin glargine), for type 1 and type 2 diabetes mellitus.
- Soliqua (insulin glargine/lixisenatide), for type 2 diabetes mellitus.
- Toujeo (insulin glargine), for type 1 and type 2 diabetes mellitus.

– Endocrinology

- Adlyxin (Lixisenatide), for type 2 diabetes mellitus.
- Admelog (insulin lispro), for type 1 and type 2 diabetes mellitus.
- Afrezza (Inhalable insulin), for type 1 and type 2 diabetes mellitus.
- Amaryl (Glimepiride), for type 2 diabetes mellitus.
- Apidra (insulin glulisine), for type 1 and type 2 diabetes mellitus.
- Cholestagel (Colesevelam), for low-calorie diet and exercise.
- Diabeta (Glyburide), for type 2 diabetes mellitus.
- Glucophage (Metformin), for type 2 diabetes mellitus, marketed by EMD Serono.
- Hectorol (Doxercalciferol), for parathyroid hormone.
- Insuman (Human insulin), for type 1 and type 2 diabetes mellitus.
- Lantus (insulin glargine), for type 1 and type 2 diabetes mellitus.
- Skelid (Tiludronic acid), for Paget's disease of bone.
- Soliqua (insulin glargine/lixisenatide), for type 2 diabetes mellitus.
- Toujeo (insulin glargine), for type 1 and type 2 diabetes mellitus.

– Gastroenterology

- Dupixent (Dupilumab), for eosinophilic esophagitis, marketed by Regeneron.
- Lanzor (Lansoprazole), for acid reflux disease.
- Seprafilm (Adhesion barrier), for internal adhesions.
- Zaltrap (Aflibercept), recombinant fusion protein, approved in metastatic colorectal cancer in combination with other agents in 2012, marketed by Regeneron.

– Hematology

- Alprolix (Factor IX), for hemophilia B.
- Arixtra (Fondaparinux), for thrombosis, marketed by GlaxoSmithKline and now owned by Mylan.
- Cablivi (Caplacizumab), for thrombosis.
- Campath (Alemtuzumab), for multiple sclerosis.
- Clolar (Clofarabine), for leukemia.
- Eloctate (Factor VIII), for hemophilia A.
- Ferrlecit (Sodium ferric gluconate complex), for iron deficiency anemia.
- Fludara (Fludarabine), for leukemia.
- Mozobil (Plerixafor), for macrocycle, approved by the FDA for peripheral blood stem cell mobilizer for non-Hodgkin's lymphoma and multiple myeloma in December 2008.
- Oforta (Fludarabine), for leukemia.
- Thymoglobulin, for hemophilia A.
- Zemaira (Alpha-1 antitrypsin), for chronic augmentation, Now owned by CSL Behring.

– Infectious diseases

- Antibiotics:
- Amoklavin (Amoxicillin/clavulanic acid)
- Claforan (Cefotaxime)
- Priftin (Rifapentine)
- Suprax (Cefixime)
- Tavanic (Levofloxacin)
- Vaccines:
  - Bacterial diseases:
- ActHIB (Hib vaccine)
- Adacel (DPT vaccine)
- Daptacel (DPT vaccine)
- Dengvaxia (Dengue vaccine)
- Menactra (Meningococcal infections)
- Mycobax (Tuberculosis vaccine)
- Pentacel (DTaP-IPV/Hib vaccine)
- Pneumo 23 (Pneumococcal infections)
- Quadracel (DTaP-IPV/Hib vaccine)
- Shanchol (Cholera vaccine)
- Synercid (Quinupristin/dalfopristin), marketed by Pfizer.
- Tenivac (Tetanus vaccine)
- Tripedia (DPT vaccine), discontinued in 2012.
- Tubersol (Tuberculosis vaccine)
- Typhim Vi (Typhoid fever)
- Vaccin Tetanique Pasteur (Tetanus vaccine)
  - Viral diseases:
- ACAM 2000 (Smallpox vaccine), eradicated in 1980 (vaccine produced as a measure in response to the threat of bioterrorism).
- Avaxim (Hepatitis A vaccine)
- Flublok (Influenza vaccine)
- Fluzone (Influenza vaccine)
- Hbvaxpro (Hepatitis B vaccine)
- Imovax Polio (Polio vaccine)
- Imovax Rabies (Rabies vaccine)
- Ipol (Polio vaccine)
- Ixiaro (Japanese encephalitis)
- M-M-RVaxPro (MMR vaccine)
- Rouvax (Measles vaccine)
- Rudivax (Rubella vaccine)
- Stamaril (Yellow fever vaccine)
- Vaxigrip (Influenza vaccine)
- YF-VAX (Yellow fever vaccine)

– Metabolic

- Actonel (Risedronic acid), for osteoporosis and Paget's disease, now owned by Allergan.
- Renagel (Sevelamer) hydrochloride, for end stage renal disease.
- Renvela (Sevelamer) hydrochloride, for end stage renal disease.

– Neurology

- Ambien (Zolpidem), for insomnia.
- Ambien CR (Zolpidem), for insomnia.
- Aubagio (Teriflunomide), for multiple sclerosis.
- Depakine (Valproic acid), for epilepsy, now owned by AbbVie.
- Depakote (Valproate semisodium), for epilepsy, now owned by AbbVie.
- Hyalgan (Sodium hyaluronate), for blood tests.
- Lemtrada (Alemtuzumab), for multiple sclerosis.
- Pediapred (Prednisolone), for multiple sclerosis.
- Rilutek (Riluzole), for ALS.
- Sabril (Vigabatrin), for epilepsy, marketed by Lundbeck.

– Oncology

- Anzemet (Dolasetron), for nausea and vomiting.
- Campath (Alemtuzumab), for multiple sclerosis.
- Caprelsa (Vandetanib), for breast, colorectal cancer and female infertility.
- Clolar (Clofarabine), for leukemia.
- Clomid (Clomifene), for female infertility.
- Dupixent (Dupilumab), for eczema, marketed by Regeneron.
- Eligard (Leuprorelin), for prostate cancer, marketed by Astellas.
- Elitek (Rasburicase), for the treatment to help stop uric acid.
- Eloxatin (Oxaliplatin), for colorectal cancer.
- Fludara (Fludarabine), for leukemia.
- Gliadel Wafer (Carmustine), for cancer, now owned by Arbor Pharmaceuticals.
- Jevtana (Cabazitaxel), for prostate cancer.
- Kevzara (Sarilumab), for blood tests, lung and prostate cancer, marketed by Regeneron.
- Libtayo (Cemiplimab), for squamous cell skin cancer, marketed by Regeneron.
- Mozobil (Plerixafor), macrocycle, approved by the FDA for peripheral blood stem cell mobilizer for non-Hodgkin's lymphoma and multiple myeloma in December 2008.
- Oforta (Fludarabine), for leukemia.
- Taxotere (Docetaxel), for breast, lung and prostate cancer.
- Uroxatral (Alfuzosin), for benign prostatic hyperplasia.
- Zaltrap (Aflibercept), recombinant fusion protein, approved in metastatic colorectal cancer in combination with other agents in 2012, marketed by Regeneron.

– Other

- Aldurazyme (Laronidase), for hurler syndrome.
- Aplenzin (Bupropion), for depression and quit smoking.
- Captique (Dermal filler), for facial wrinkles.
- Carticel (Knee cartilage replacement therapy), for knee pain.
- Cerdelga (Eliglustat), for type 1 gaucher disease.
- Ceredase (Alglucerase), for Gaucher's disease.
- Cerezyme (Imiglucerase), for Gaucher's disease.
- Elaprase (Idursulfase), marketed by Shire.
- Epicel (cultured epidermal autografts), for thickness burns.
- Fabrazyme (Agalsidase), for Fabry disease.
- Flagyl (Metronidazole), for vaginal infections, marketed by Pfizer.
- Hylaform Plus (Injectable filler), for facial wrinkles.
- Lumizyme (Alglucosidase alfa), for Pompe disease.
- Myozyme (Alglucosidase alfa), for Pompe disease.
- Sculptra (Polylactic acid), for facial fat loss.
- Thyrogen (Thyroid-stimulating hormone), for thyroid cancer.

– Over the counter

- Allegra (Fexofenadine), for allergic rhinitis.
- Buscopan (Hyoscine butylbromide), for abdominal pain.
- Maalox (Calcium carbonate), an antacid.
- Nasacort (Triamcinolone), for allergic rhinitis.
- Novaldol (Paracetamol), for pain and fever.
- Unisom (Doxylamine), for night-time allergy and cold relief.
- Xyzal (Levocetirizine), for allergic rhinitis, marketed by UCB.
- Telfast for Seasonal Allergy Relief
- Enterogermina Medicine for Diarrhea

– Pain

- Bi-profined (Ketoprofen), for pain.
- Solpadol (Codeine), for chronic pain.

– Respiratory and inflammatory diseases

- Atrovent (Ipratropium bromide), for asthma, marketed by Boehringer Ingelheim.
- Azmacort (Triamcinolone), for asthma.
- Dupixent (Dupilumab), for eosinophilic asthma and chronic rhinosinusitis with nasal polyposis, marketed by Regeneron.
- Dynabac (Dirithromycin), for acute bacterial exacerbations.
- Ketek (Telithromycin), for community acquired pneumonia.
- Priftin (Rifapentine), for tuberculosis.
- Rifadin (Rifampin), for tuberculosis.
- Rifamate (Isoniazid/rifampicin), for tuberculosis.
- Rifater (Rifampicin/isoniazid/pyrazinamide), for tuberculosis.
- Tilade (Nedocromil), for asthma.
- Zagam (Sparfloxacin), for chronic bronchitis.
- Zemaira (Alpha-1 antitrypsin), for chronic augmentation, now owned by CSL Behring.
- Mucosolvan Medicine for Cough
- Rhinathiol (Carbocisteine), for cough and mucus.

– Rheumatology

- Arava (Leflunomide), for rheumatoid and psoriatic arthritis.
- Kevzara (Sarilumab), for blood tests, lung and prostate cancer, marketed by Regeneron.
- Primaquine (Primaquine), for malaria.
- Synvisc (Hyaluronic acid), for knee pain.

– Urology

- Ditropan XL (Oxybutynin chloride), for bladder relief, marketed by Janssen.
- Eligard (Leuprorelin), for prostate cancer, marketed by Astellas.
- Flomax (Tamsulosin), for bladder relief, marketed by Astellas.

The company also produces a broad range of over-the-counter products, among them Allegra, IcyHot for muscle pain, Gold Bond for skin irritation, and Selsun Blue dandruff shampoo. These brands were acquired in 2010, when Sanofi-Aventis purchased Chattem.

=== Pipeline ===
As of 2013, Sanofi was in a race with Amgen and Pfizer to win approval for a drug that inhibits PCSK9, a protein that slows the clearance of low-density lipoprotein (LDL) cholesterol – the form of cholesterol that leads to heart attacks. Sanofi's drug, a monoclonal antibody, was discovered by Regeneron Pharmaceuticals and is called alirocumab. An FDA warning in March 2014, about possible cognitive adverse effects of PCSK9 inhibition threw the competition into disarray, as the FDA asked companies to include neurocognitive testing into their Phase III clinical trials.

In 2013, Sanofi announced that another candidate from its collaboration with Regeneron, a monoclonal antibody against the interleukin 6 receptor, sarilumab, had better efficacy than placebo in its first Phase III trial in rheumatoid arthritis.

=== Management ===
- Frédéric Oudéa, chairman (April 2023 - )
- Olivier Charmeil, interim CEO
- Belén Garijo, incoming CEO; planned start date of April 29, 2026
- Jean-François Dehecq was the general manager of Sanofi from its creation in 1973 until 2007.
- François-Xavier Roger, CFO

=== Stockholders ===
As of 31 December 2013:

- Breakdown of share ownership: 8.93% by L'Oréal, 0.27% treasury shares and 1.31% employees. The remaining 89.49% were publicly traded. (Note: Total reduced its stake to less than 5% in 2011.)

== Head office ==
Former head office 174 avenue de France, Paris 13th arrondissement

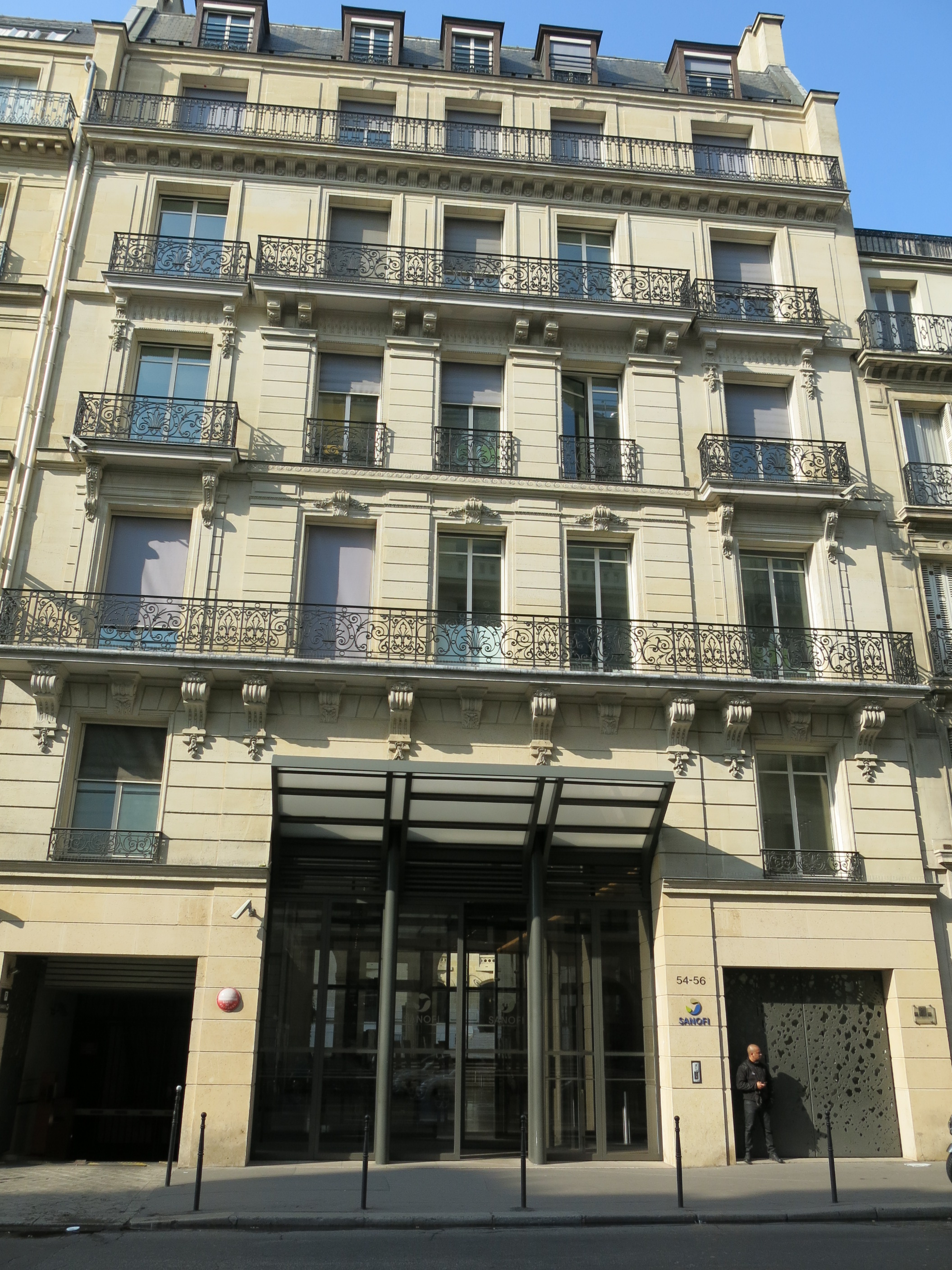
Head office 54 rue de la Boétie, Paris 8th arrondissement

In January 2012, Sanofi moved its head office location to 54, Rue La Boétie in the 8th arrondissement of Paris. This former mansion designed by architect René-Patouillard had previously been the head office of Alcatel-Lucent.

Sanofi's previous head office was located in the 13th arrondissement of Paris, at 174 Avenue de France. The architecture of the head office is of the predominant style of the area surrounding the François Mitterrand Library. After Sanofi and Aventis merged, the employees at the former Aventis head office in Schiltigheim, Alsace, moved to Paris.

In November 2022, Sanofi moved into its new global headquarters in the 17th arrondissement of Paris, at 46-48 Avenue de la Grande Armée.

== Corporate offices ==
In 2025 Sanofi opened a new 260,000-square-foot U.S. headquarters in May 2025 at M Station West in Morristown, New Jersey. Sanofi moved its US headquarters to Morristown, NJ from Bridgewater, NJ which is home to other large companies such as Brother USA, Biocon Biologics, Amneal Pharmaceuticals, and BAUSCH Health.

== Collaborative research ==
In addition to internal research and development activities, Sanofi is also involved in publicly funded collaborative research projects, with other industrial and academic partners. One example in the area of non-clinical safety assessment is the InnoMed PredTox project The company is expanding its activities in joint research projects within the framework of the Innovative Medicines Initiative of EFPIA and the European Commission.

In June 2010, Sanofi and the Charité University of Berlin signed a cooperation agreement for the research and development of medicines and therapies.

In January 2026, Sanofi announced a strategic investment of up to $25 million in Adagene to collaborate on masked antibody therapies.

== Sanofi Pasteur ==
In 2005, Sanofi Pasteur, the vaccines division of Sanofi Group, was awarded a $97 Million United States Department of Health and Human Services (HHS) contract.

=== BCG supply shortage 2012–2014 ===
In 2011, a Sanofi Pasteur plant flooded, causing it problems with mold. The facility, located in Toronto, Ontario, Canada, produced BCG vaccine products, made with the Glaxo 1077 strain, such as a tuberculosis vaccine ImmuCYST, a BCG Immunotherapeutic, a bladder cancer drug. By April 2012, the FDA had found dozens of documented problems with sterility at the plant, including mold, nesting birds, and rusted electrical conduits. The plant was closed for over two years, resulting in shortages of bladder cancer and tuberculosis vaccines. On 29 October 2014 Health Canada gave Sanofi permission to resume production of BCG.

=== COVID-19 vaccine ===
In 2020, Sanofi, together with GSK, signed a deal with the US government's Operation Warp Speed to provide 100 million doses of COVID-19 vaccine for up to US$2.1 billion, if the vaccine was approved.

As of August 2020, COVID-19 vaccine development in Sanofi underscored its fundamental competitiveness weakness, with which management has been struggling and failed to deal with for many years, beyond cutting more costs. Unfortunately, even though the approach of Sanofi-GSK is based on pre-existing, approved platforms and technology (as with Flublok flu), without reinventing the wheel of the necessary infrastructure, the company lagged behind many other rivals in delivering a working vaccine. Sanofi planned to start Phase 1 clinical testing only in September and expected emergency use approval in the first half of 2021. Competitors such as Novavax had already completed Phase 1 studies, with promising results, and Moderna-NIH had already initiated its Phase 3 trial. According to CNBC reports, as part of the $2.1 billion US government deal, more than 750 million went to supporting Sanofi-GSK in vaccine development and clinical trials. Sanofi turn-outs "accelerate" the development via a smaller biotech firm, Translate Bio, with a $425M partnership.

At the end of September 2021, Sanofi announced that it would stop developing its mRNA COVID-19 vaccine. Despite promising results, the drug would not continue to Phase 3 trials, and the company stated that it would be 'too late to reach the market.'

On May 10, 2024, a Sanofi press release announced a co-exclusive licensing agreement between Sanofi and Novavax "to co-commercialize COVID-19 vaccine and develop novel flu-COVID-19 combination vaccines." The 2026 Nuvaxovid website, including vaccine locator page, is copyright Sanofi and does not feature the Novavax company name.

== Opella ==
Opella is the former Consumer Healthcare (CHC) division of Sanofi, established as an independent company headquartered in France on April 30, 2025. Its formation followed the sale of a 50.0% controlling stake by Sanofi to the private equity firm Clayton, Dubilier & Rice (CD&R). Sanofi retained a significant 48.2% minority shareholding, while the French public investment bank Bpifrance acquired a 1.8% stake. The transaction provided Sanofi with approximately €10 billion in net cash proceeds.

== Associations ==
Sanofi is a full member of the European Federation of Pharmaceutical Industries and Associations (EFPIA), the Biotechnology Industry Organization (BIO), and the Pharmaceutical Research and Manufacturers of America (PhRMA).

Sanofi's vaccine subsidiary, Sanofi Pasteur, is a member of EuropaBio.

In June 2021, Sanofi partnered with Capgemini, Orange & Generali to launch Future4care, an all-European start-up accelerator centered on digital health.

== Aventis Foundation ==
The Aventis Foundation, a German charitable trust, was established in 1996, as the Hoechst Foundation, with an endowment of €50 million. In 2000, the foundation was renamed the Aventis Foundation. The foundation promotes cultural and scientific projects, specifically focused on the Frankfurt Rhine-Main area.

== See also ==
- Amgen Inc v. Sanofi, a United States Supreme Court case on patent enablement
- Sanofi Biogenius Canada
