= Trolamine salicylate =

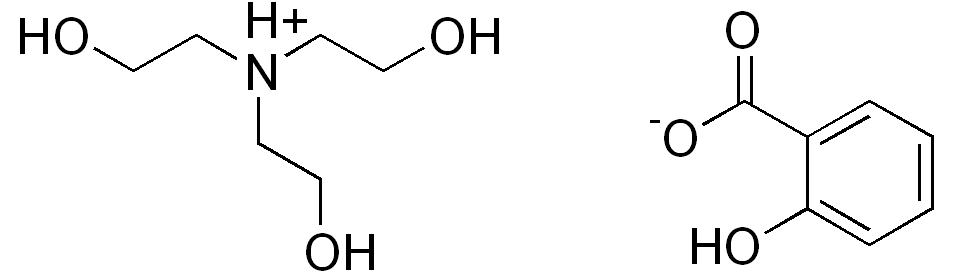

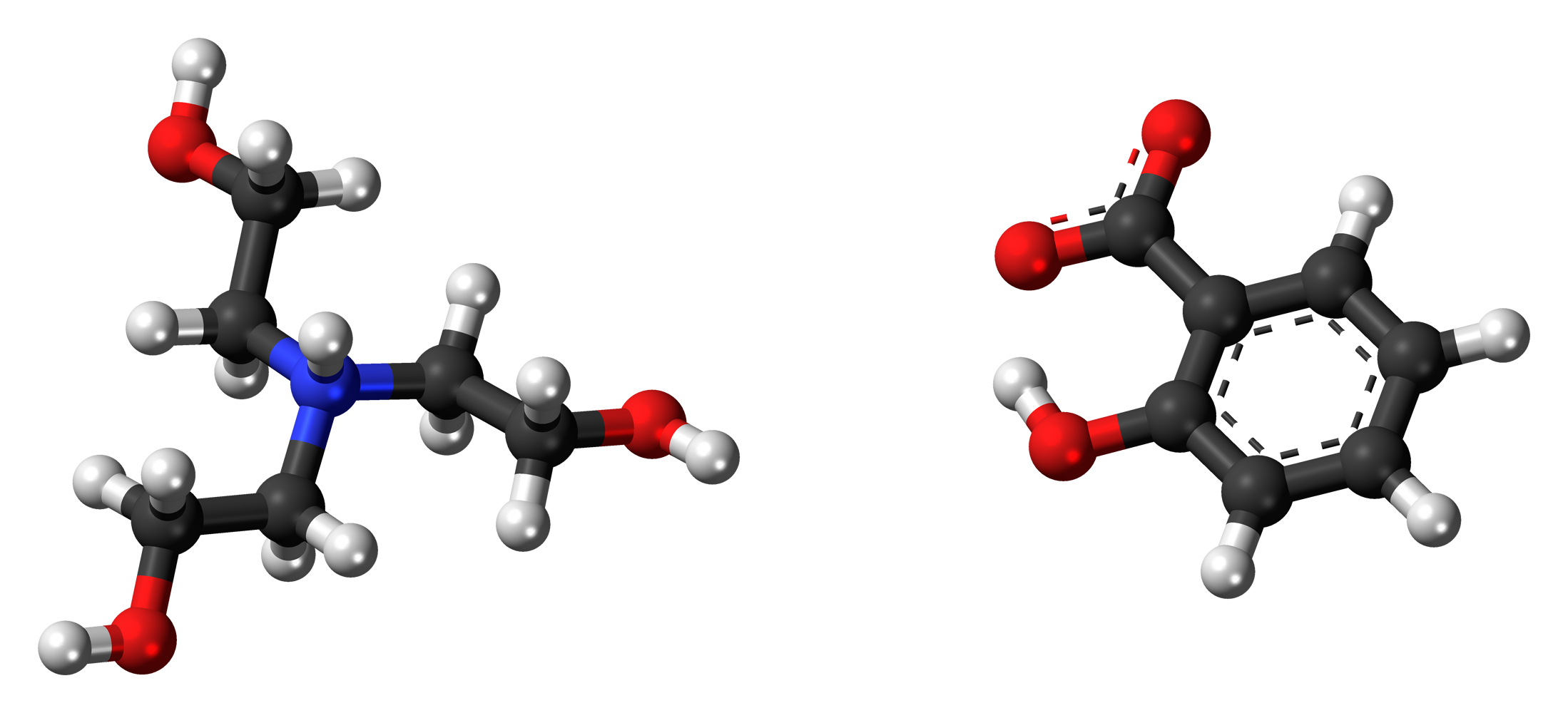

Names
- Preferred IUPAC name 2-Hydroxy-N,N-bis(2-hydroxyethyl)ethan-1-aminium 2-hydroxybenzoate
- Other names: Tris(2-hydroxyethyl)ammonium 2-hydroxybenzoate; Tris(2-hydroxyethyl)ammonium salicylate; TEA salicylate; Triethanolamine salicylate; Triethanolaminium salicylate

Identifiers
CAS Number	2174-16-5
3D model (JSmol)	Interactive image
ChemSpider	23549
ECHA InfoCard	100.016.847
PubChem CID	25213
UNII	H8O4040BHD
CompTox Dashboard (EPA)	DTXSID4047969
- InChI: InChI=1S/C7H6O3.C6H15NO3/c8-6-4-2-1-3-5(6)7(9)10;8-4-1-7(2-5-9)3-6-10/h1-4,8H,(H,9,10);8-10H,1-6H2 Key: UEVAMYPIMMOEFW-UHFFFAOYSA-N; InChI=1/C7H6O3.C6H15NO3/c8-6-4-2-1-3-5(6)7(9)10;8-4-1-7(2-5-9)3-6-10/h1-4,8H,(H,9,10);8-10H,1-6H2 Key: UEVAMYPIMMOEFW-UHFFFAOYAM
- SMILES: O=C(O)c1ccccc1O.OCCN(CCO)CCO

Properties
Chemical formula	C_{13}H_{21}NO_{6}
Molar mass	287.312 g·mol^{−1}
Appearance	Beige crystals or lumps
Odor	odorless
Melting point	50 °C (122 °F; 323 K)
Boiling point	Decomposes
Solubility in water	Soluble, 11.3 mg/mL (predicted)

Hazards
- Occupational safety and health (OHS/OSH)
Main hazards	Serious eye damage
- GHS labelling
Pictograms	(GHS07: Exclamation mark)
Signal word	Warning
Hazard statements	H302, H315, H319, H335
Precautionary statements	P261, P264, P270, P271, P280, P301+P317, P302+P352, P304+P340, P305+P351+P338, P312, P317, P319, P321, P330, P332, P337, P362+P364, P403+P233, P405, P501
- Lethal dose or concentration (LD, LC)
LD_{50} (median dose)	500 mg/kg (oral, estimated value)
- Except where otherwise noted, data are given for materials in their standard state (at 25 °C [77 °F], 100 kPa). verify (what is ?) Infobox references

Trolamine salicylate (Aspercreme, Aspergel) is an organic compound with the chemical formula [HN(CH_{2}CH_{2}OH)_{3}]^{+}C_{6}H_{4}(OH)(COO^{−}). It is a salt of triethanolamine and salicylic acid, i.e. the compound consists of protonated triethanolamine and the conjugate base of salicylic acid, salicylate.

It is used as an ingredient in sunscreens, analgesic creams, and cosmetics. The salicylic acid portion contributes to both the sun protection effect (by absorbing UVB radiation) and to the analgesic effect. The triethanolamine neutralizes the acidity of the salicylic acid. One benefit of this topical analgesic is that it has no odor, in contrast to other topical analgesics such as menthol.

The US Food and Drug Administration has not reviewed any of the over-the-counter products listed in the Daily Med database that contain trolamine salicylate. Also, the producers of trolamine salicylate products have not provided evidence to the FDA in support of claims that this chemical is directly absorbed through the skin into underlying tissue. Due to health concerns, in 2019 the FDA issued a proposed rule classifying the sunscreen use of trolamine salicylate as "not generally recognized as safe and effective." One study reported that trolamine salicylate does penetrate into, and persist within, underlying muscle tissue. The test subjects used either the trolamine salicylate product or a placebo while engaging in an exercise regimen designed to induce muscle soreness. The experimenters observed that those using the trolamine salicylate product exercised longer before reporting the onset of soreness, reported less intense soreness, and reported that their soreness did not last as long as the people who used the placebo.

All of the trolamine salicylate-containing products listed in the two cited references are 10% solutions. These products are sold under various brand names, e.g. Aspercreme, and are marketed as topical analgesics for temporary relief of arthritis, simple backache, muscle strains, and sprains.

== See also ==
- Methyl salicylate
