= Levocetirizine =

Antihistamine medication

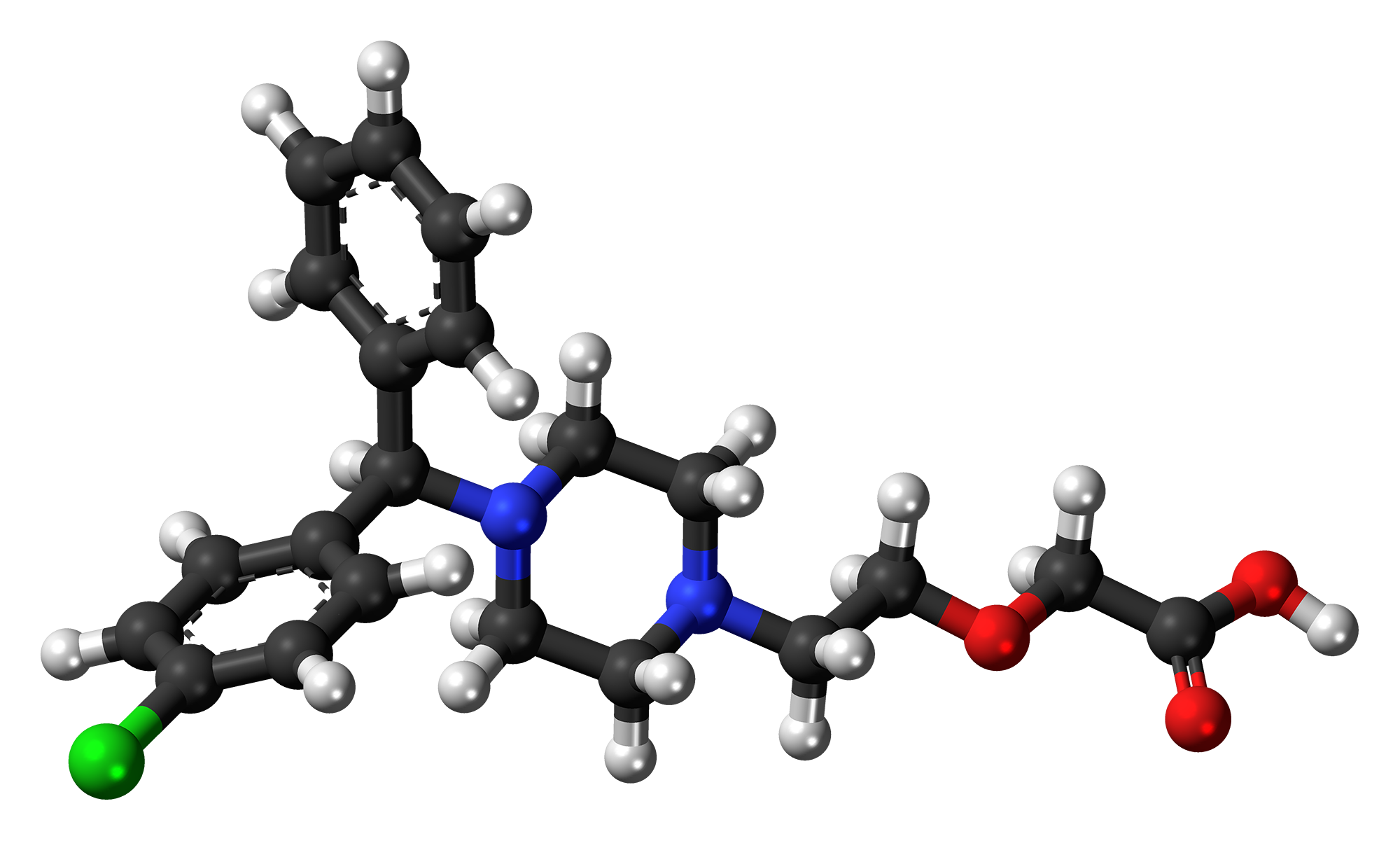

Clinical data
- Trade names: Xyzal, others
- Other names: Levocetirizine dihydrochloride
- AHFS/Drugs.com: Monograph
- MedlinePlus: a607056
- License data: US DailyMed: Levocetirizine
- Routes of administration: By mouth
- Drug class: Second generation antihistamines
- ATC code: R06AE09 (WHO)

Legal status
- Legal status: UK: POM (Prescription only); US: OTC / Rx-only

Pharmacokinetic data
- Bioavailability: High
- Protein binding: 91–92%
- Metabolism: Minimal (less than 14%, primarily CYP3A4)
- Elimination half-life: 8 to 9 hours
- Excretion: Urine: 85% Feces: 12.9%

Identifiers
- IUPAC name: 2-(2-{4-[(R)-(4-Chlorophenyl)(phenyl)methyl]piperazin-1-yl}ethoxy)acetic acid
- CAS Number: 130018-77-8
- PubChem CID: 1549000
- IUPHAR/BPS: 1214
- DrugBank: DB06282
- ChemSpider: 1266001
- UNII: 6U5EA9RT2O
- KEGG: D07402; as salt: D08118
- ChEBI: CHEBI:94559
- ChEMBL: ChEMBL1201191
- PDB ligand: LCR (PDBe, RCSB PDB)
- CompTox Dashboard (EPA): DTXSID60156294

Chemical and physical data
- Formula: C_{21}H_{25}ClN_{2}O_{3}
- Molar mass: 388.89 g·mol^{−1}
- 3D model (JSmol): Interactive image
- SMILES: Clc1ccc(cc1)[C@H](N2CCN(CCOCC(=O)O)CC2)c3ccccc3
- InChI: InChI=1S/C21H25ClN2O3/c22-19-8-6-18(7-9-19)21(17-4-2-1-3-5-17)24-12-10-23(11-13-24)14-15-27-16-20(25)26/h1-9,21H,10-16H2,(H,25,26)/t21-/m1/s1; Key:ZKLPARSLTMPFCP-OAQYLSRUSA-N

Levocetirizine, sold under the brand name Xyzal, among others, is a second-generation antihistamine used for the treatment of allergic rhinitis (hay fever) and long-term hives of unclear cause. It is less sedating than older antihistamines. It is taken by mouth.

Common side effects include sleepiness, dry mouth, cough, vomiting, and diarrhea. Use in pregnancy appears safe but has not been well studied and use when breastfeeding is of unclear safety. It is classified as a second-generation antihistamine and works by blocking histamine H_{1}-receptors.

Levocetirizine was patented in 1965, and approved for medical use in the United States in 2007, and is available as a generic medication. In 2023, it was the 158th most commonly prescribed medication in the United States, with more than 3 million prescriptions.

== Medical uses ==
Levocetirizine is used for allergic rhinitis. This includes allergy symptoms such as watery eyes, runny nose, sneezing, hives, and itching.

== Side effects ==
Levocetirizine is referred to as a non-sedating antihistamine as it does not enter the brain in significant amounts and is therefore unlikely to cause drowsiness. Cardiac safety with repolarization may be better than some other antihistamines, as levocetirizine does not significantly prolong the QT interval in healthy individuals. However, some people may still experience some slight sleepiness, headache, mouth dryness, lightheadedness, vision problems (mainly blurred vision), palpitations and fatigue.

On 16 May 2025, the U.S. Food and Drug Administration (FDA) issued a Drug Safety Communication regarding a rare but severe itching, known as pruritus, that can occur after discontinuing long-term use of levocetirizine or cetirizine. This itching has been reported in patients who used these medicines daily, typically for at least a few months and often for years, and did not experience itching before starting the medication.

== Pharmacology ==
Levocetirizine is an antihistamine. It acts as an inverse agonist that decreases activity at histamine H1 receptors. This in turn prevents the release of other allergy chemicals and increases the blood supply to the area, providing relief from the typical symptoms of hay fever.

In radioligand competition assays using Mepyramine, Levocetirizine binds the human histamine H1 receptor with high affinity (Ki ≈ 6 nM) and shows about 600-fold selectivity for H1 over a panel of other receptors and ion channels. Binding is stereoselective: the (R)-enantiomer, levocetirizine, has the highest affinity (Ki ≈ 3 nM), while (S)-cetirizine is markedly weaker (Ki ≈ 100 nM). Levocetirizine also dissociates from the receptor much more slowly than (S)-cetirizine (half-times of about 142 and 6 minutes, respectively), which may explain why it behaves as a pseudo-irreversible antagonist in functional tissue studies despite appearing competitive in binding assays. Mutagenesis work suggests that the carboxylic acid group of levocetirizine interacts with the lysine residue at position 191 of the receptor. Replacing Lys191 with Alanine reduced levocetirizine's affinity to about 12 nM and shortened its dissociation half-time to about 13 minutes.

== Chemistry ==
Chemically, levocetirizine is the active levorotary enantiomer of cetirizine, also called the l-enantiomer of cetirizine. It is a member of the diphenylmethylpiperazine group of antihistamines.

== History ==
Levocetirizine was first launched in 2001 by the Belgian pharmaceutical company UCB (Union Chimique Belge).

== Society and culture ==
=== Availability ===
In January 2017, the US Food and Drug Administration approved an over-the-counter preparation. Levocetirizine had previously received authorization by the FDA as a prescription drug in 2007, having already been brought to market throughout much of Europe. In India, a prescription-only drug containing levocetirizine hydrochloride and montelukast is sold as Crohist MK.

=== Brand names ===
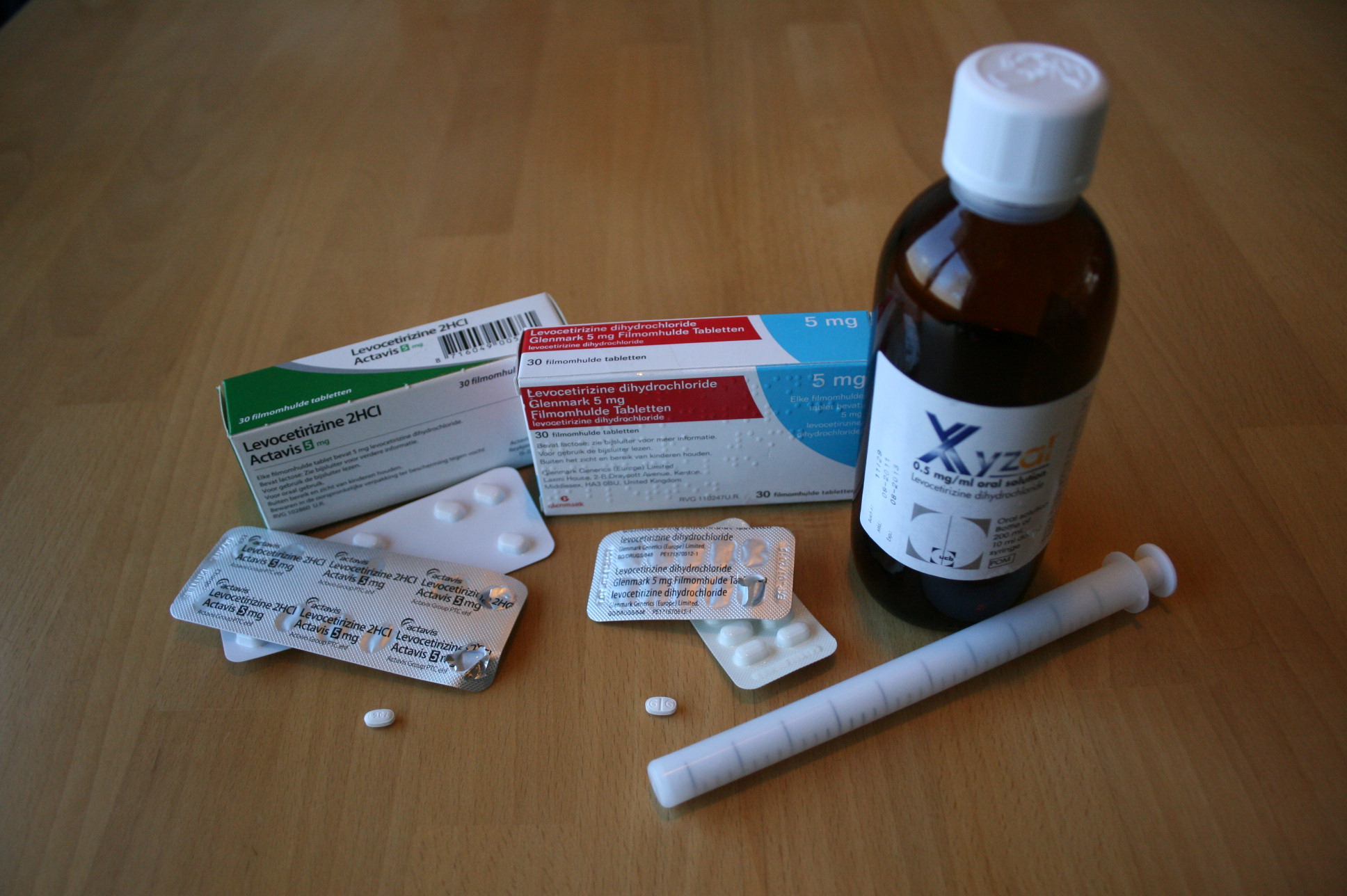
Different brands (Actavis, Glenmark, UCB) Levocetirizine tablets and oral solution

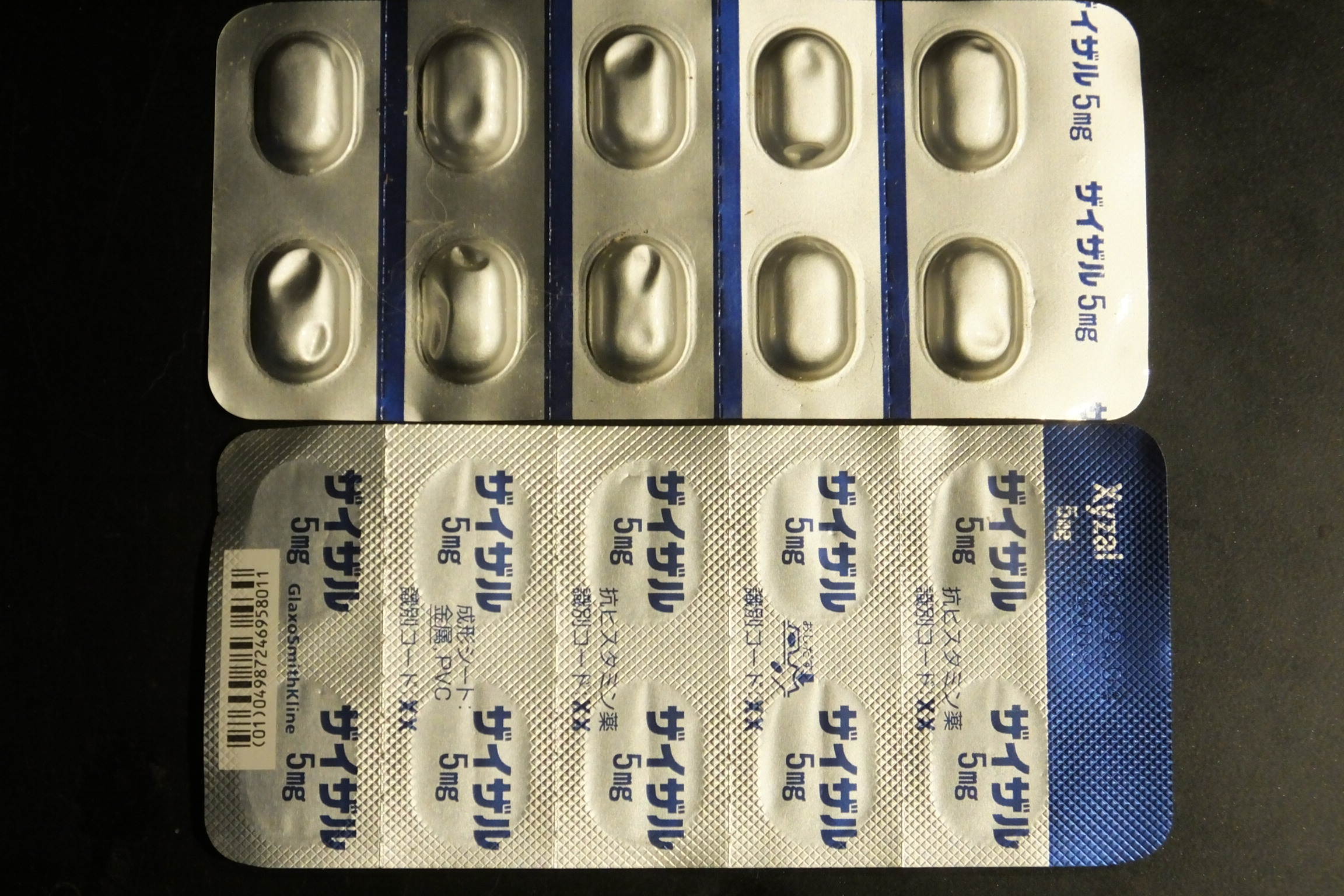
Xyzal Tablets 5mg in Japan

Preparations of levocetirizine are sold under the following brand names:

- Xyzal /ˈzaɪˌzɑːl/ in Australia, Austria, Bulgaria, Croatia, Cyprus, Czech Republic, Finland, France, Hong Kong, Hungary, India, Ireland (also Rinozal), Italy, Japan, Lithuania, Netherlands, Poland, Portugal, Romania, Taiwan, Thailand, Turkey, The Philippines, Serbia, Singapore, Slovakia, Slovenia, South Africa, Switzerland, US and UK. In May 2007, the US Food and Drug Administration approved Xyzal, where it is co-marketed by Sanofi-Aventis.
- Xazal in Spain.
- Avocel, Histrine Levo, and Xybat in Indonesia
- Zobral in Cyprus.
- Levobert in India.
- Xusal in Germany and Mexico.
- Xozal in Greece.
- Degraler in Chile.
- Allevo in Egypt.
- Zilola, Histisynt, and Xyzal (UCB) in Hungary.
- Alcet, Curin, and Seasonix in Bangladesh.
- Vozet and Uvnil in India.
- T-Day Syrup in Pakistan.
- Curin in Nepal.
- Zenaro in the Czech Republic and Slovakia.
- Xuzal and Zival in Chile.
- Cezera, Levosetil, Robenan, and Xyzal in Serbia.
- Rinozal and Xyzal in Ireland.
- XylaClear in Hong Kong.
- Xycet in Morocco.
