= Louis-Charles Malassez =

French anatomist and histologist (1842–1909)

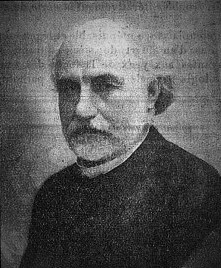
Louis-Charles Malassez

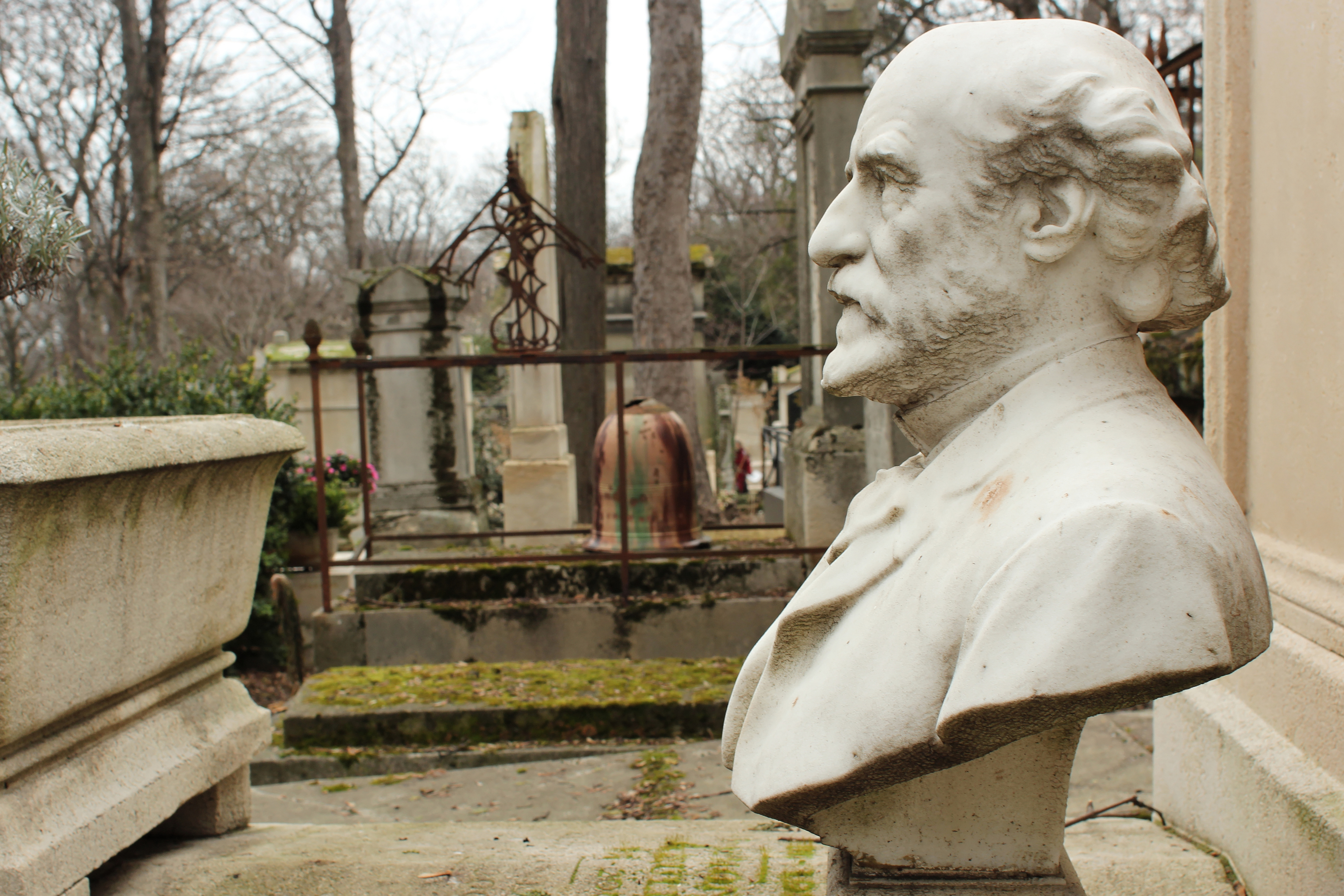
Bust of Louis-Charles Malassez, on his grave.

Louis-Charles Malassez (21 September 1842 – 22 December 1909) was a French anatomist and histologist born in Nevers, department of Nièvre.

He studied medicine in Paris, where he worked as an interne from 1867. He served with the 5th Ambulance Corps during the Franco-Prussian War, afterwards returning to Paris, where he worked with distinguished physicians that included Claude Bernard, Jean-Martin Charcot and Pierre Potain. In 1875, he attained the chair of anatomy at Collège de France, and in 1894 he became a member of the Académie de Médecine.

He conducted histological research of the blood, and is credited for design of the hemocytometer, a device used to quantitatively measure blood cells. In the field of dentistry, he described residual cells of the epithelial root sheath in the periodontal ligament. These remaining cells are referred to as epithelial cell rests of Malassez (ERM).

A genus of fungi called Malassezia bears his name. The species in the genus include: Malassezia furfur, Malassezia ovalis, Malassezia pachydermatis, Malassezia sympodialis and Malassezia orbiculare. Malassezia furfur is a lipophilic species that forms on human skin and can cause seborrheic dermatitis and tinea versicolor, Malassezia pachydermatis is a species that is associated with otitis externa in dogs.

== Selected publications ==
- 'De la numération des globules rouges du sang. I. Des méthodes de numération. II. De la richesse du sang en globules rouges dans les différentes parties de l'arbre circulatoire. Paris 1873
- Sur les lésions histologiques de la syphilis testiculaire. Paris, 1881 - (with Paul Reclus 1847-1914).
- Sur l’existence d’amas épithéliaux autour de la racine des dents chez l’homme adulte et a l’état normal (débris épithéliaux paradentaires. Paris, 1885
- Sur les role des débris épithéliaux paradentaires. In: Archives de physiologie normale et pathologique. Paris, S. 309–340, 1885

== Bibliography ==
- Dorlands's Medical Dictionary, Definition of Malassezia species & Cell rests
- Gies, W. J. (1934). "Proceedings of the Twelfth General Meeting, Stevens Hotel, Chicago, Illinois, March 17 and 18, 1934". Journal of Dental Research. 14 (3): 153–241. doi:10.1177/00220345340140030101. S2CID 71976077.
- Malassezia Infections of the Skin, D. R. Thomas, MD, FRCPC
- List of publications copied from the equivalent article at the German Wikipedia.
