= Malassezia equina =

Scientific classification
- Kingdom: Fungi
- Division: Basidiomycota
- Class: Malasseziomycetes
- Order: Malasseziales
- Family: Malasseziaceae
- Genus: Malassezia
- Species: M. equina

Binomial name
- Malassezia equina Cabañes & Boekhout (2007)

Species of fungus

Malassezia equina is a fungus first isolated in horses, which can cause opportunistic infections in animals. Its type strain is MA146=CBS 9969. This species will not grow without any lipid supplementation. It grows slowly and forms small colonies (average diameter 1.3 millimetres (0.051 in)). In the lab, colonies will not grow at temperatures of 40 °C, differing from M. sympodialis-related species, such M. dermatis and M. nana, which can grow at this temperature. Malassezia caprae cells are ovoidal.
