= Mycobiota =

Fungi present in a certain place

Mycobiota (plural noun, no singular) are a group of all the fungi present in a particular geographic region (e.g. "the mycobiota of Ireland") or habitat type (e.g. "the mycobiota of cocoa"). An analogous term for mycobiota is funga.

== Human mycobiota ==
Mycobiota exist on the surface and in the gastrointestinal system of humans. There are as many as sixty-six genera and 184 species in the gastrointestinal tract of healthy people. Most of these are in the Candida genera.

Though found to be present on the skin and in the gi tract in healthy individuals, the normal resident mycobiota can become pathogenic in those who are immunocompromised. Such multispecies infections lead to higher mortalities. In addition hospital-acquired infections by C. albicans have become a cause of major health concerns. A high mortality rate of 40-60% is associated with systemic infection. The best-studied of these are Candida species due to their ability to become pathogenic in immunocompromised and even in healthy hosts. Yeasts are also present on the skin, such as Malassezia species, where they consume oils secreted from the sebaceous glands. Pityrosporum (Malassezia) ovale, which is lipid-dependent and found only on humans. P. ovale was later divided into two species, P. ovale and P. orbiculare, but current sources consider these terms to refer to a single species of fungus, with M. furfur the preferred name.

== Funga ==
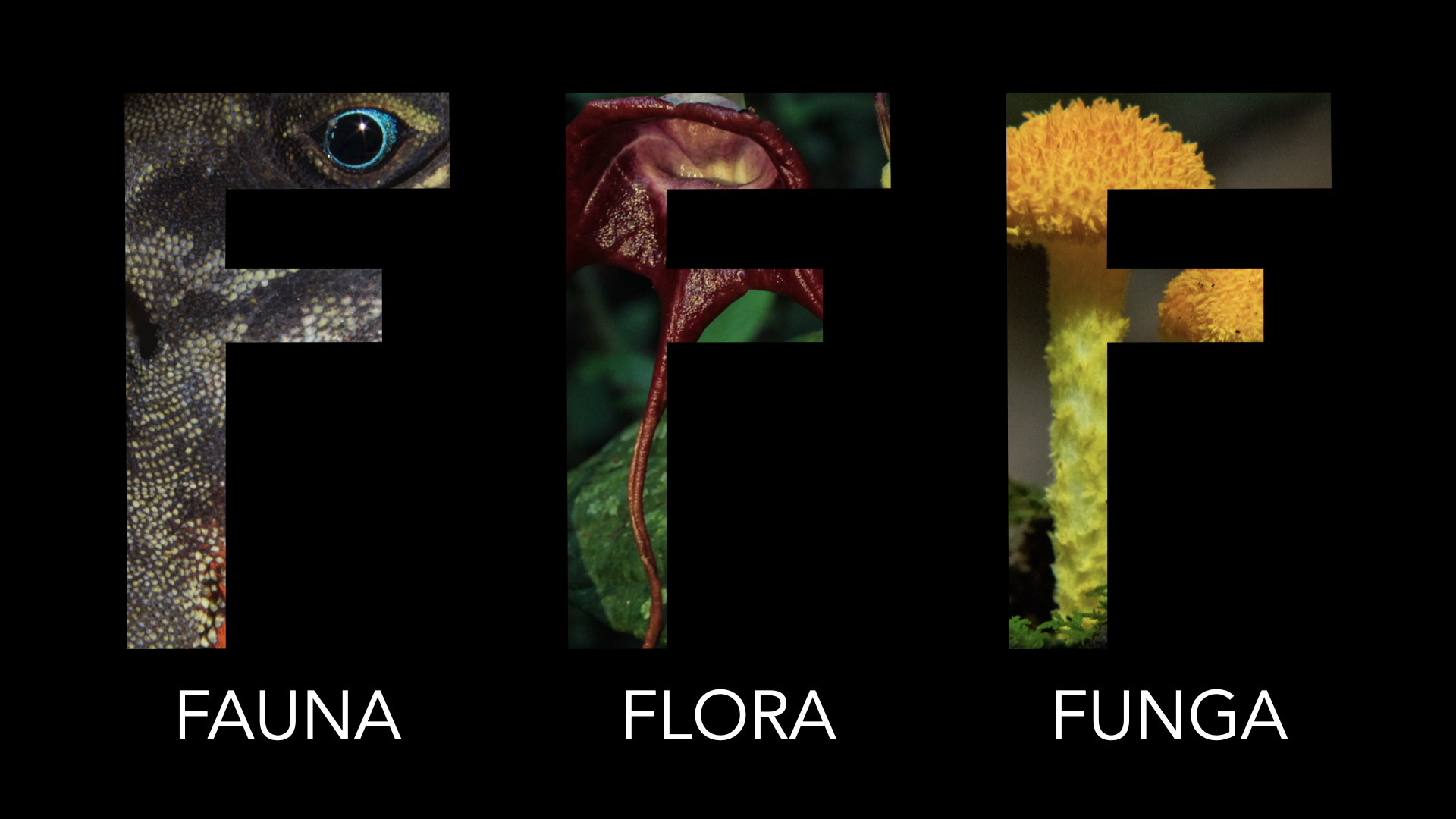
The 3Fs Initiative: Fauna, Flora, Funga

Funga, a synonym of 'mycobiota', is all the fungi of a particular region, habitat, or geological period. It is a recent term (2000s) for the kingdom Fungi similar to the longstanding fauna for animals and flora for plants. The term seeks to simplify projects oriented toward implementation of educational and conservation goals. It highlights parallel terminology referring to treatments of these macroorganisms in particular geographical areas. An official proposal for the term occurred in 2018, despite previous use. The previous term for all fungi in an area was mycobiota, a rather complex word which struggled to pass laws regarding the protection of fungi biodiversity.

The Species Survival Commission (SSC) of the International Union for Conservation of Nature (IUCN) in August 2021 called for the recognition of fungi as one of three kingdoms of life, and critical to protecting and restoring Earth. Funga was recommended by the IUCN in 2021. They ask that the phrase animals and plants be replaced by animals, fungi, and plants, and fauna and flora by fauna, flora, and funga.

== Other uses ==
There is a peer reviewed mycological journal titled Mycobiota.
