= Malassez cell =

The Malassez cell may refer to:

- The epithelial cell rests of Malassez, part of the periodontal ligament
- A hemocytometer, a chamber typically used to count blood cells
