= Malassezia nana =

Scientific classification
- Kingdom: Fungi
- Division: Basidiomycota
- Class: Malasseziomycetes
- Order: Malasseziales
- Family: Malasseziaceae
- Genus: Malassezia
- Species: M. nana

Binomial name
- Malassezia nana A.Hirai, R.Kano, Makimura, H.Yamag. & A.Haseg. (2004)

Species of fungus

Malassezia nana is a fungus that can cause opportunistic infections in animals. It was first isolated from animals in Japan and Brazil. M. nana resembles M. dermatis and M. sympodialis, but is distinguished from these species by its inability to use Kolliphor EL (Sigma) as the sole lipid source and to hydrolyse aesculin. The type strain of M. nana is NUSV 1003T(=CBS 9557T=JCM 12085T).
