= Turk's solution =

WBC diluting fluid

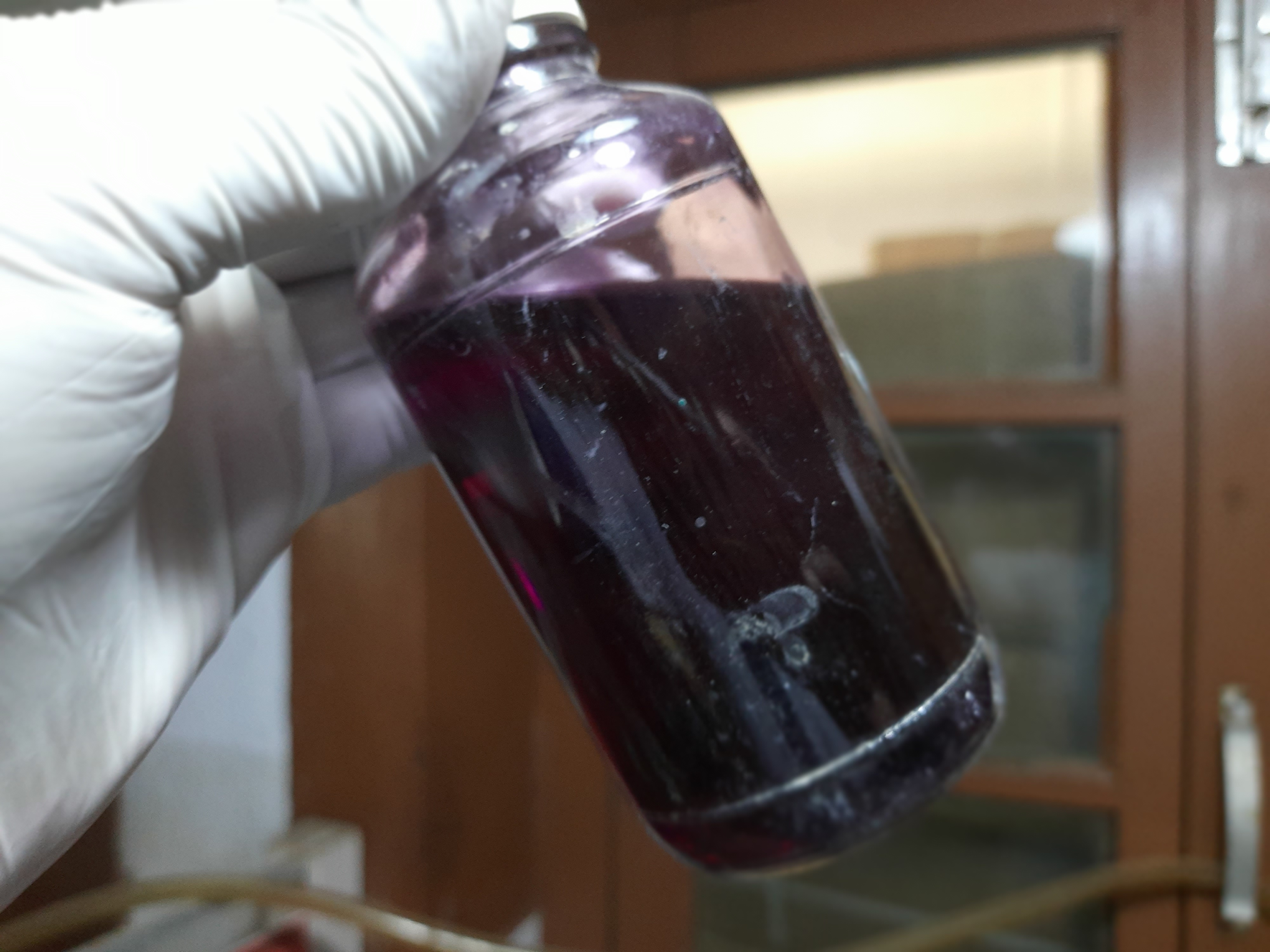
Türk's solution in a laboratory bottle

In hemocytometry, Türk's solution (or Türk's fluid) is a hematological stain (either crystal violet or aqueous methylene blue) prepared in 99% acetic acid (glacial) and distilled water. The solution destroys the red blood cells and platelets within a blood sample (acetic acid being the main lyzing agent), and stains the nuclei of the white blood cells, making them easier to see and count.

Türk's solution is intended for use in determining total leukocyte count in a defined volume of blood. Erythrocytes are hemolyzed while leukocytes are stained for easy visualization.

Composition of Türk's solution is as follows:

Component	Volume
Crystal violet	1 mL
Glacial acetic acid	1.5 mL
Distilled water	100 mL
