= Malassezia caprae =

Scientific classification
- Kingdom: Fungi
- Division: Basidiomycota
- Class: Malasseziomycetes
- Order: Malasseziales
- Family: Malasseziaceae
- Genus: Malassezia
- Species: M. caprae

Binomial name
- Malassezia caprae J.Cabañes & Boekhout (2007)

Species of fungus

Malassezia caprae is a fungus first isolated in goats, which can cause opportunistic infections in animals. Its type strain is MA383=CBS 10434. This species will not grow without any lipid supplementation. It grows slowly and forms small colonies (average diameter 1 millimetre (0.039 in)). In the lab, colonies will not grow at temperatures of 40 °C, differing from M. sympodialis-related species, such 'M. dermatis' and M. nana, which can grow at this temperature. Malassezia caprae cells are ellipsoidal to more or less spherical.
