= Hyaline layer of Hopewell-Smith =

The Hyaline layer of Hopewell Smith, also known as intermediate cementum, is a narrow hypercalcified zone at the junction between cementum and dentin in the root of the human tooth. It is said that this structure is referred to as the hyaline layer of Hopewell Smith when present in the acellular extrinsic fiber cementum (AEFC) region and known as intermediate cementum when present in the cellular mixed stratified cementum (CMSC) region. Intermediate cementum is 0.5–0.8 μm thick and is initially unmineralized but eventually mineralizes. Hopewell-Smith depicted that this layer is a thin homogeneous layer between the Tomes granular layer and the acellular extrinsic fiber cementum. There have been two theories in regards to the origin of the hyaline layer of Hopewell Smith. According to one group, the intermediate cementum is classified as part of the dentin, specifically the mantle dentin as the continuation of dentinal tubules were seen between the intermediate cementum and dentin showing no boundary in between whereas the other group believed that it is enameloid-like tissue and originated from Hertwig's epithelial root sheath as it contains enamel matrix proteins. Bencze used the term intermediate cementum to describe the thin region of cellular elements present between cellular mixed stratified cementum and dentin. This layer is one of the least studied structure in the human tooth.

== Structure and Composition ==
Depending on location, morphology and histological appearance, Schroeder (1992) has classified cementum as:

1. Acellular Afibrillar Cementum (AAC)
2. Acellular Extrinsic Fiber Cementum (AEFC)
3. Cellular Mixed Stratified Cementum (CMSC)
4. Cellular Intrinsic Fiber Cementum (CIFC)
5. Intermediate Cementum (OR) The Hyaline Layer of Hopewell-Smith

Hyaline layer of hopewell Smith is a poorly defined zone near the cementodentinal junction of certain sheath embedded in calcified ground substance. This layer contains enamel like proteins, which help in attachment of cementum to dentin.

As for its composition, it has:

- mineral component primarily consisting of hydroxyapatite which contributes to its rigidity and mineralization.
- Enamel matrix proteins such as amelogenin which regulate mineralization and cementoblast attachment.
- Non-Collagenous Proteins (NCPs) such as bone sialoprotein and osteopontin. They play important roles in the mineralization process, binding collagen fibrils and hydroxyapatite
- Collagen content: The collagen present is mostly Type I collagen, with minor amounts of Type III collagen.
- Proteoglycans

== Formation and Development ==
The Hyaline Layer of Hopewell Smith, also called intermediate cementum, is a thin, mineralised layer that is produced by Hertwig's epithelial root sheath. Its formation begins after the first layer of root dentine (mantle dentine) is created. At this stage, cells in Hertwig's epithelial root sheath release enamel like and dentine related proteins into the space between the tooth sheath and the newly formed dentine. These proteins then harden, forming the hyaline layer, which extends from the cemento-enamel junction to the apical third of the root, where it eventually blends with surrounding tissues and becomes unrecognisable.

This layer plays a critical role in cementum formation and acts as a bonding layer that facilitates the adhesion of primary acellular cementum to the root dentine. Some researchers propose that because periodontal ligament fibres attach to it, the hyaline layer might even be considered a fourth tooth-supporting tissue.

As Hertwig's epithelial root sheath breaks down, small groups of its remaining cells, known as the epithelial cell rests of malassez, remain in the periodontal ligament. Simultaneously, dental follicle cells migrate and differentiate into cementoblasts, which deposit cementum over the hyaline layer.

Studies indicate that enamel matrix proteins play a role in forming the hyaline layer along the developing root surface. Although hyaline layer proteins and enamel proteins share some structural similarities, they also have distinct amino acid compositions, making hyaline layer proteins a unique class of enamel-related proteins.

== Functions ==
The hyaline layer of Hopewell-Smith plays a vital role in cementum attachment, periodontal integrity, and regenerative dental procedures. This thin, mineralized layer, located between Tomes' granular layer and the internal acellular layer of cementum, serves as an essential interface that promotes the adhesion of cementoblasts and the deposition of acellular extrinsic fiber cementum. The initial hyaline layer dentin mineralisation takes place within matrix vesicles. It is within the hyaline layer that mineralisation occurs, not at its outermost. Mineralisation spreads out from this initial core and towards the pulp and periodontal ligament. The hyaline layer's outermost region hence exhibits delayed mineralisation. When this layer is fully mineralised, it spreads outward and continues into a fibrous fringe that the cementoblast secretes. The dentin is therefore joined to the initial layers of acellular cementum. An "acellular extrinsic fibre cementum" is created when the periodontal ligament fibres bind to the fibrous fringe.

The hyaline layer of Hopewell-Smith enriched with enamel matrix-like proteins, facilitates the integration of Sharpey's fibers from the periodontal ligament (PDL), ensuring tooth stability and resistance to occlusal forces. This layer serves as a critical interface in periodontal regeneration, facilitating the attachment and differentiation of periodontal cells essential for the development of cementum and the periodontal ligament. This highly mineralized layer, secreted by Hertwig's epithelial root sheath (HERS) following the formation of root dentin, provides a scaffold for the migration and adhesion of dental follicle-derived cells, which subsequently differentiate into cementoblasts and fibroblasts. Cementoblasts contribute to the formation of cementum, an integral component in periodontal attachment, while fibroblasts play a pivotal role in periodontal ligament development. Additionally, Emdogain, a widely used enamel matrix derivative, has been shown to significantly contribute to periodontal regeneration by stimulating cell proliferation, extracellular matrix production, and progenitor cell differentiation. This regenerative potential is likely due to the presence of enamel matrix-like proteins within the hyaline layer of Hopewell-Smith, which serve as biological cues for periodontal tissue development. These proteins play a crucial role in mimicking natural periodontal formation processes, thereby aiding in cementum deposition, periodontal ligament regeneration, and overall tissue repair. It is also found that the thickness of the hyaline layer of Hopewell Smith significantly impacts periodontal regeneration. Collectively, the hyaline layer, along with HERS and its derivatives, plays a fundamental role in periodontal tissue regeneration, offering a structural and biochemical foundation for the restoration of periodontal integrity.

== Clinical Significance ==
The hyaline layer acts as an intermediary for cementoblast adhesion, promoting the initial development of cementum. Defects in this layer may result in atypical cementum formation, compromising root anchoring.

Periodontal Attachment — This layer serves as a robust bonding surface between dentin and cementum, guaranteeing a solid attachment of the periodontal ligament (PDL). Disruption may lead to diminished periodontal support and heightened tooth movement.

Resistance to Root Resorption - Due to its high mineralisation, it offers a certain level of protection against external root resorption, frequently observed in orthodontic treatment, trauma, or periodontal disease.

Clinical Implications in Endodontics — During root canal therapy, this layer may affect sealer adaption and dentin adhesion. Improper removal or alteration may adversely affect the quality of endodontic sealing and the overall outcome of the therapy.

Function in Periodontal Diseases and Regeneration - Injury to the hyaline layer resulting from inflammation, trauma, or surgical procedures may hinder cementum regeneration, hence impacting periodontal repair.

== Pathological Considerations ==
The intermediate cementum serves as a protective barrier between cementum and dentin. If this layer is compromised through dental trauma and is combined with root canal infection, this will stimulate clastic cells which can bind to mineralised tissues and eventually lead to rapid resorption. This layer plays a crucial role in preventing external root resorption by covering the dentinal tubules, thereby shielding the periodontal ligament from root canal irritants. Additionally, it effectively blocks the outward movement of drugs or medicaments used in the treatment of pulpless teeth. This layer also helps prevent inflammatory root resorption caused by necrotic tissue or microbial content within the root canal, particularly after traumatic events like tooth luxation. While surface resorption of the external cementum is a common consequence of dental trauma, more severe forms such as inflammatory and replacement resorption can develop if the intermediate cementum layer is breached. This layer functions as a permeability barrier; once compromised, it permits harmful stimuli from the root canal to pass through the highly permeable dentin, triggering more aggressive external resorption.

The absence or deficiency of the Hyaline Layer of Hopewell-Smith may result in various clinical and histopathological ramifications.

1. Impaired Cementum Development

The hyaline layer functions as an essential substrate for cementoblast adhesion. In its absence, cementum may fail to develop adequately or may be entirely absent (cementum aplasia or hypoplasia).

This may result in inadequate root coverage and exposure of the underlying dentin, increasing the tooth's vulnerability to hypersensitivity and external resorption.

2. Compromised Periodontal Attachment

The insertion of periodontal ligament (PDL) fibres into cementum implies that a deficient or absent hyaline layer may result in inadequate anchoring of PDL fibres.

This may lead to diminished periodontal attachment, heightening the risk of tooth mobility, exacerbation of periodontal disease, and possible premature tooth loss.

3. Elevated Risk of Root Resorption

The highly mineralised hyaline layer serves as a protective barrier against both external and internal root resorption.

In the absence of root dentin, it becomes increasingly vulnerable to resorption generated by orthodontic treatment, trauma, or inflammation, as observed in diseases like apical periodontitis.

4. Endodontic and Restorative Difficulties

In root canal therapy, the absence of a hyaline layer may impair sealer adaptation and dentin bonding, resulting in possible leakage or failure of endodontic treatment.

Cementum flaws in restorative operations can undermine the adhesion of dental components, impacting long-term efficacy.

5. Compromised Periodontal Regeneration

In instances of periodontal disease or regenerative interventions, the lack of the hyaline layer may impede new cementum development, hence restricting healing and regeneration.

This may diminish the efficacy of procedures such as guided tissue regeneration (GTR) or root conditioning treatments.

== Comparison with other Dental Structures ==
Feature	Hyaline Layer	Dentin	Cementum	Enamel
Location	Cementodentinal junction (CDJ), between dentin and cementum.	Bulk of the tooth, under enamel and cementum.	Covers the root, anchoring periodontal fibers.	Covers the crown, protecting dentin.
Formation	Formed by odontoblasts before cementum deposition.	Formed by odontoblasts from the dental papilla.	Formed by cementoblasts from the dental follicle.	Formed by ameloblasts from the enamel organ.
Cellular Content	Acellular	Contains odontoblasts and dentinal tubules.	Cellular or acellular (depends on location).	Acellular.
Mineralization	Highly mineralized (more than dentin, less than enamel).	Moderately mineralized (70% hydroxyapatite).	Less mineralized than dentin (45-50%).	Most mineralized (96-97% hydroxyapatite).
Organic Matrix	Contains non-collagenous proteins.	Collagen type I, proteoglycans, and dentin phosphoprotein.	Collagen type I, III, XII, and proteoglycans.	Amelogenins, enamelins (no collagen)
Structure	Homogeneous, structureless layer.	Tubular structure with dentinal tubules.	Contains Sharpey's fibers for PDL attachment.	Organized in enamel rods and interrods.
Resorption Resistance	Highly resistant to resorption.	More prone to resorption than the hyaline layer.	More resistant to resorption than dentin.	Does not resorb naturally but can wear down.
Function	Acts as a bonding layer for cementum attachment, resists resorption.	Provides structural support and distributes forces.	Anchors PDL fibers for tooth stability.	Hard protective covering, prevents erosion.
