= Potain =

Potain may refer to:

== Companies ==
- Potain (company): French tower cranes company bought in 2001 by Manitowoc Cranes.

== People ==
- Faustin Potain (1898-1968): French industrial who found Potain (company).
- Nicolas Marie Potain (1723-1790): French architect.
- Pierre Potain (1825-1901): French cardiologist.
