= Juvenile active ossifying fibroma =

Benign, rapidly growing fibro-osseous tumor

A juvenile active ossifying fibroma is a benign fibro-osseous neoplasm composed of mixture of stroma and bone characterized by rapid and destructive growth.

== Classification ==
This tumor has gone by several names in the past, but active ossifying fibroma is similar to juvenile active ossifying fibroma, except it does not develop in young patients. Aggressive psammomatoid ossifying fibroma is still employed by some, but is to be discouraged.

== Signs and symptoms ==
Most patients are asymptomatic, and come to clinical attention when a mass is discovered incidentally on routine dental X-rays. When patients are symptomatic, they present with non-specific symptoms, such as chronic sinusitis, rhinorrhea, obstruction, pain, facial enlargement and possibly visual changes.

== Imaging findings ==
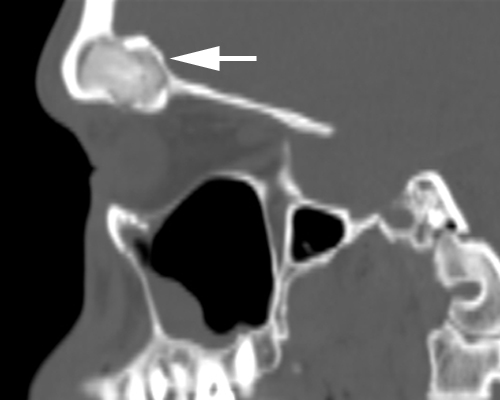
A computed tomography sagittal view of a front sinus active ossifying fibroma

When performing imaging studies, bone windows in computed tomography studies are the best. The lesion is usually identified as a well demarcated, expansile mass with an ossified rim at the periphery. Calcifications are noted throughout. MRI shows a variable finding depending on T1 or T2 weighted images, dependent on the amount of bone to fibrous connective tissue ratio.

== Pathology findings ==
The tumors are described as "shelling out" by the surgeon, which gives a well-circumscribed, smooth surface of tan, white, firm-gritty material. The tumors range in size from a few millimeters up to 10 cm.

A hematoxylin and eosin stained slide show a cellular stroma with an innumerable psammoatoid calcifications

By microscopic evaluation, the tumors are composed of a variably cellular stroma make up of spindled to stellate fibroblast-like cells. Within this stroma, are numerous small, rounded, mineralized collagenous ossicles and immature osteoid. Many times the curved-shaped bone fragments have a collagenous rim around them. Ossicles may fuse to form much large mineralizations. Cementum-like psammomatous bodies (cementicles) may also be present. Osteoblastic rimming is not uncommon. Occasionally, giant cells and even mitoses are seen.

== Differential diagnoses ==
Active ossifying fibroma must be separated from fibrous dysplasia, cementoblastoma, and meningioma. This type of separation must be made with the aid of imaging studies, and should not be done by histology examination only.

== Management ==
It is important to get complete excision as early in the disease process as possible. Once the lesion is removed, the prognosis is excellent. However, if the lesion is incompletely excised, recurrences may be seen in up to 60% of patients. The recurrences are highest in sinus tumors.

== Epidemiology ==
This tumor is far less common than conventional ossifying fibroma, and is considered a rare tumor. Patients usually come to clinical attention when <15 years of age, but a wide age range (3 months to 70 years) can be affected. Both genders are affected equally, with the paranasal sinuses most commonly affected. Specifically, the ethmoid sinus is affected most often, followed by frontal sinus, maxillary sinus and sphenoid sinus. The maxilla is the second most common location after the paranasal sinuses, while the mandible and temporal bone are infrequently affected. This tumor does not frequently extracranial sites nor soft tissues sites.
