= Malassezia vespertilionis =

Scientific classification
- Kingdom: Fungi
- Division: Basidiomycota
- Class: Malasseziomycetes
- Order: Malasseziales
- Family: Malasseziaceae
- Genus: Malassezia
- Species: M. vespertilionis

Binomial name
- Malassezia vespertilionis J.M.Lorch & Vanderwolf (2018)

Species of fungus

Malassezia vespertilionis is a species of yeast-like fungus that grows on the skin of bats. It was described as a new species in 2018. The holotype was obtained from a swab of wing skin of a hibernating northern long-eared bat (Myotis septentrionalis) collected in Wisconsin. The species epithet vespertilionis uses the Latin vespertilio (bat) to refer to the host.

Additional isolates were collected from various bat species in several locations in the United States – Alabama, California, Kentucky, Missouri, New York, Pennsylvania, and Wisconsin. Other bat species that harbor the fungus are the California myotis (Myotis californicus), the fringed myotis (Myotis thysanodes), the Indiana bat (Myotis sodalis), the little brown bat (Myotis lucifugus), the gray bat (Myotis grisescens), and the silver-haired bat (Lasionycteris noctivagans). The fungus appears to be fairly common on bats found in the United States, occurring in 28% of 264 individuals sampled.

== Description ==
When grown on Leeming and Notman agar (LNA), colonies of Malassezia vespertilionis are about 0.5–1.0 mm (0.02–0.04 in) in diameter after 10 days of growth at 24 °C (75 °F); this increases to about 2–5 mm (0.08–0.20 in) after 40 days. The fungus was able to grow at a variety of temperatures ranging from 7 to 40 °C (45 to 104 °F), but grew best at 24 °C (75 °F). The cells have an ellipsoid or ovoid shape (in rare instances they are spherical), ranging in size from 2–3 by 2–4 μm, although 2 by 3 μm is the usual size.
