= Malassezia japonica =

Scientific classification
- Kingdom: Fungi
- Division: Basidiomycota
- Class: Malasseziomycetes
- Order: Malasseziales
- Family: Malasseziaceae
- Genus: Malassezia
- Species: M. japonica

Binomial name
- Malassezia japonica Sugita, M.Takash., M.Kodama, Tsuboi & A.Nishikawa (2003)

Species of fungus

Malassezia japonica is a fungus that can cause opportunistic infections in animals.
