= Pierre Potain =

French cardiologist (1825–1901)

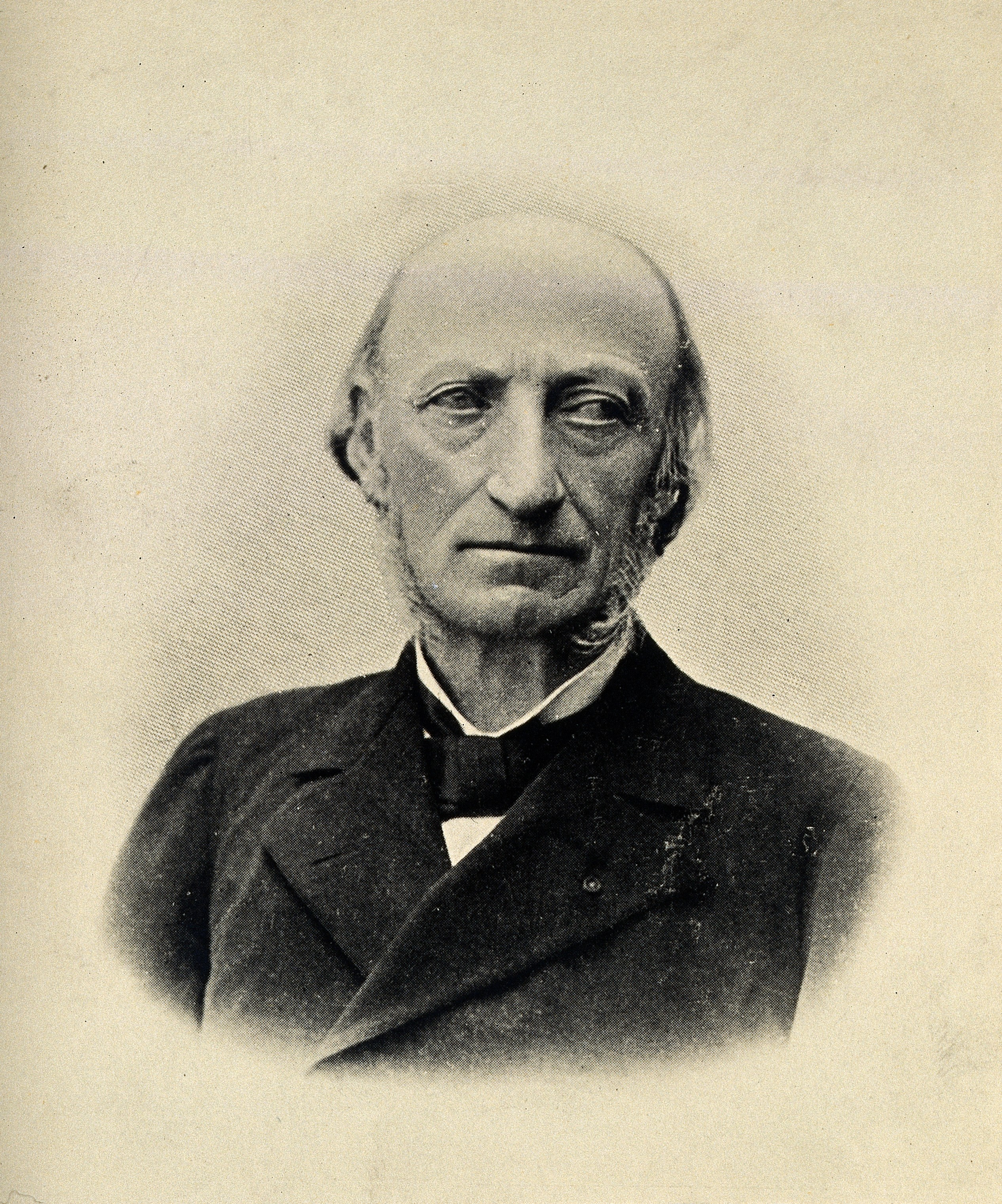
Pierre Potain

Pierre Carle Édouard Potain (19 July 1825 – 5 January 1901) was a French cardiologist born in Paris.

In 1853 he earned his doctorate from the University of Paris, and later worked as an assistant to Jules Baillarger (1809–1890) at the mental asylum in Ivry-sur-Seine. In 1856 he began work in the clinic of Jean-Baptiste Bouillaud (1796–1881), whom Potain regarded as a major influence to his career. Afterwards, he worked in various hospitals in Paris, including the Hôpital Saint-Antoine and Hôpital Necker. In 1861 he was appointed médecin des hôpitaux and an associate professor to the Paris medical faculty. In 1876 he attained the chair of pathology, and soon afterwards served as chair of clinical medicine. From 1882 to 1900 he was associated with the Hôpital de la Charité.

Potain made several contributions in his research of cardiovascular disease, and conducted various tests in the field of cardiology. These tests included analysis of jugular venous waves, heart gallop rhythm research, blood pressure testing and auscultatory analysis. In 1889 he was credited for making modifications to the sphygmomanometer, a device used to measure blood pressure that had been recently invented by Samuel Siegfried Carl von Basch (1837–1905). He also designed a pleural suction apparatus and made improvements to the Malassez hemocytometer.

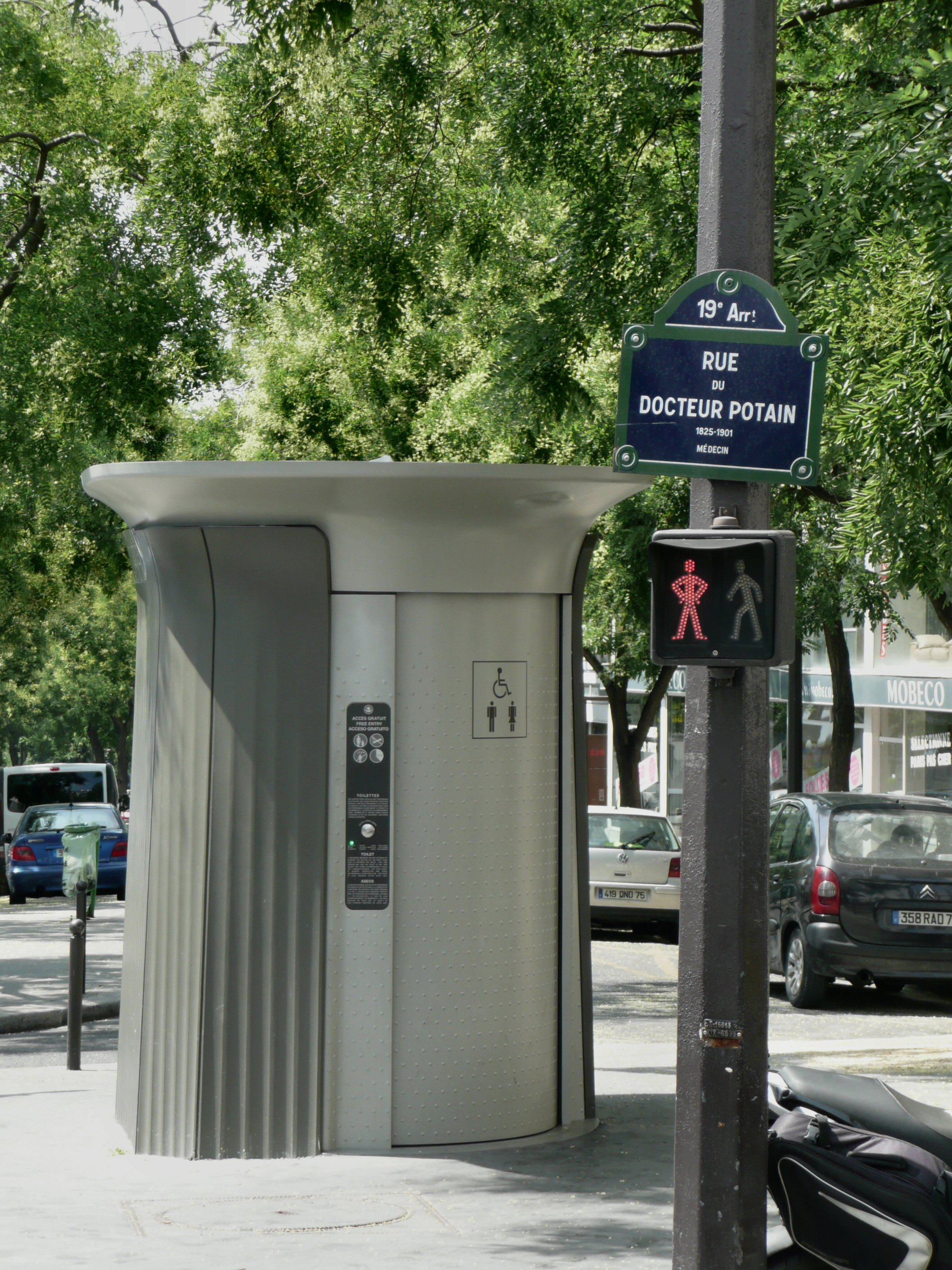
Plauque dedicated to Potain on Rue du Docteur-Potain

The term "Potain's sign" is an extension of percussion dullness over the aortic arch from the manubrium to the third costal cartilage on the right-hand side of the body. Potain's name is associated with several other eponymous medical terms; the following terms are seldom used today and are for historical purposes only.

- "Potain's disease": pulmonary edema
- "Potain's solution": diluent used in a procedure to count red blood cells
- "Potain's syndrome": dyspepsia with expansion of the right ventricle, and an increase of pulmonary auscultation.

He was a member of the Académie de Médecine (1883), the Académie des Sciences (1893) and a commander of the Légion d'honneur (1895). In the 19th arrondissement of Paris, there is a street named Rue du Docteur Potain.

== Written works ==
- Des lésions des ganglions lymphatiques viscéraux. Paris, Remquet, 1860 – Lesions of visceral lymph nodes.
- De la Succession des mouvements du coeur, réfutation des opinions de M. Beau, leçon faite à l'Hôtel-Dieu. Paris: impr. de H. Plon, 1863 – On successive motions of the heart, refuting the opinions of Mr. Beau, lesson at the Hôtel-Dieu.
- Note sur les dédoublements normaux des bruits du coeur, présentée à la Société médicale des hôpitaux, dans la séance du 22 juin 1866, par le Dr Potain,. Paris: impr. de F. Malteste, 1866 – Paper on normal duplication of heart sounds, etc.
- Des mouvements et des bruits qui se passent dans les veines jugulaires. Bull. Soc. Méd. Hôp. Paris (Mémoires), 1867, 2 sér., 4, 3-27 – Movements and noises that occur in the jugular veins.
- Du Rhythme cardiaque appelé bruit de galop, de son mécanisme et de sa valeur séméiologique, note présentée à la Société médicale des hôpitaux de Paris. Paris: A. Delahaye, 1876. También en : Bull. Soc. Méd. Hôp. Paris (Mémoires), (1875), 1876, 12, 137–66. – Rhythm of the heart known as gallop rhythm, its mechanism and its diagnostic value, etc.
- Des Fluxions pleuro-pulmonaires réflexes d'origine utéro-ovarienne. Paris: impr. de Chaix, 1884 – Fluxions of pleuro-pulmonary reflexes of utero-ovarian origin.
- Du sphygmomanomètre et de la mesure de la pression artérielle chez l'homme à l'état normale et pathologique. Arch. Physiol. Nom. Path., 5 sér., 1, 556-69 – Sphygmomanometer and blood pressure measurement of humans in normal and pathological states
- Dernière leçon de M. le professeur Potain. Paris: impr. de J. Gainche, 1900.* (Final lesson of Professor Potain).
- La Pression artérielle de l'homme à l'état normal et pathologique Paris: Masson, 1902 – Blood pressure of humans in normal and pathological states.
