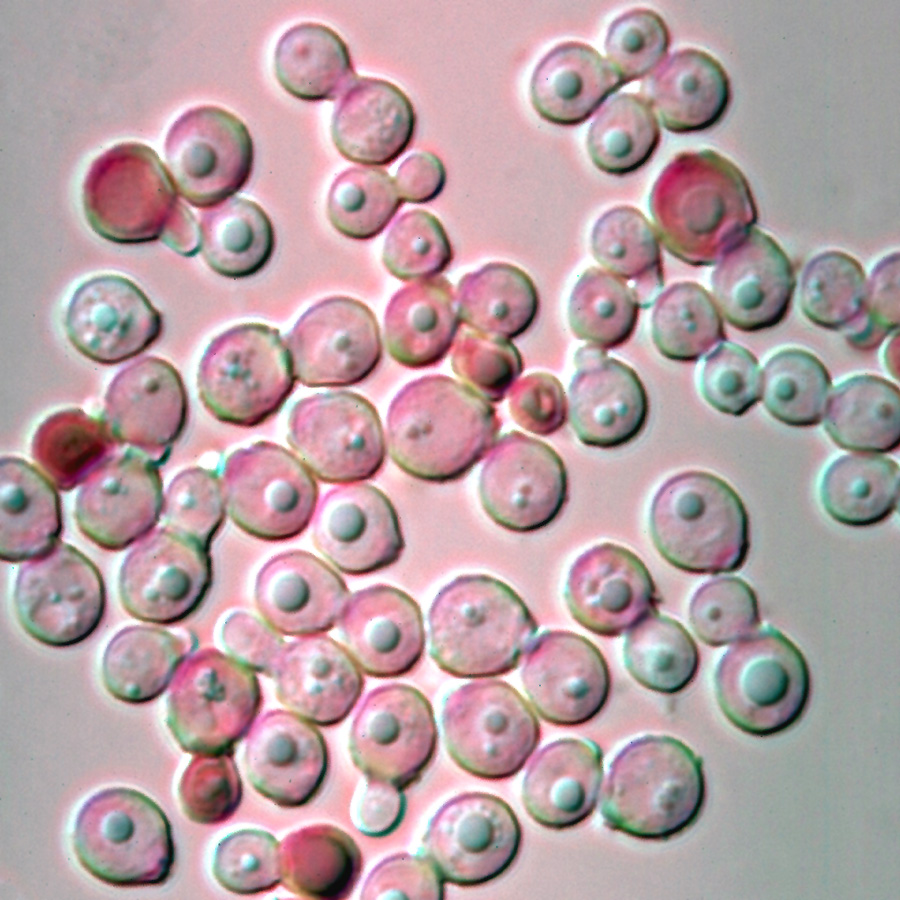

Scientific classification
- Kingdom: Fungi
- Division: Basidiomycota
- Class: Malasseziomycetes
- Order: Malasseziales
- Family: Malasseziaceae
- Genus: Malassezia
- Species: M. globosa

Binomial name
- Malassezia globosa Midgley, E.Guého & J.Guillot

= Malassezia globosa =

Species of fungus

Malassezia globosa is a species of yeast.

The skin rash of tinea versicolor (pityriasis versicolor) is also due to infection by this fungus.

== Cause of dandruff and dermatitis ==
In 2007, it was discovered that the responsible agent that metabolizes triglycerides present in sebum by the expression of lipase is a scalp specific fungus, Malassezia globosa (previously thought to be Malassezia furfur), resulting in a lipid byproduct: oleic acid.

Identification of Malassezia on skin has been aided by the application of molecular or DNA-based techniques. These investigations show that the Malassezia species causing most skin disease in humans, including the most common cause of dandruff and seborrhoeic dermatitis, is M. globosa (though M. restricta is also involved). The skin rash of tinea versicolor (pityriasis versicolor) is also due to infection by this fungus.

As the fungus requires fat to grow, it is most common in areas with many sebaceous glands: on the scalp, face, and upper part of the body. When the fungus grows too rapidly, the natural renewal of cells is disturbed, and dandruff appears with itching (a similar process may also occur with other fungi or bacteria).

A project in 2007 has sequenced the genome of dandruff-causing Malassezia globosa and found it to have 4,285 genes. M. globosa uses eight different types of lipase, along with three phospholipases, to break down the oils on the scalp. Any of these 11 proteins would be a suitable target for dandruff medications.

The number of specimens of M. globosa on a human head can be up to ten million.

Malassezia globosa has been predicted to have the ability to reproduce sexually, but this has not been observed.
