= Malassezia arunalokei =

Scientific classification
- Kingdom: Fungi
- Division: Basidiomycota
- Class: Malasseziomycetes
- Order: Malasseziales
- Family: Malasseziaceae
- Genus: Malassezia
- Species: M. arunalokei

Binomial name
- Malassezia arunalokei Honnavar, Rudramurthy & G.S.Prasad (2016)

Type strain
- NCCPF 127130

Species of yeast-like fungus

Malassezia arunalokei is a species of yeast-like fungus that was identified as a new to science in 2016. It has been isolated from the skin of both seborrheic dermatitis patients and healthy individuals from India. A combination of several phenotypic characteristics distinguish this species from others in genus Malassezia. These include: colony morphology (when grown on nutrient agar); the absence of activity from the enzyme catalase; growth at 37 °C (99 °F); and the precipitation that results when grown with the chemicals Tween 20 or Cremophor EL.

The type strain is NCCPF 127130 (housed at the National Culture Collection of Pathogenic Fungi in New Delhi), which was isolated from the scalp of an individual with seborrheic dermatitis in Chandigarh, India. The most closely related fungus is M. restricta, but the two internal transcribed spacer DNA sequences of these species differ by 6.4%, which meets the generally accepted criteria for genetic distinctiveness. The species epithet arunalokei honors Indian mycologist Arunaloke Chakrabarti, "for his numerous contributions to the development of medical mycology in India and Asia".

In later studies, methods were introduced to detect this species using the mass spectroscopy technique known as matrix-assisted laser desorption/ionization–time of flight (MALDI-TOF), as well as using polymerase chain reaction sequencing directly from clinical samples. Using the latter technique, the fungus was identified for the first time from an individual in Iran.
