= Jean-Baptiste Bouillaud =

French physician

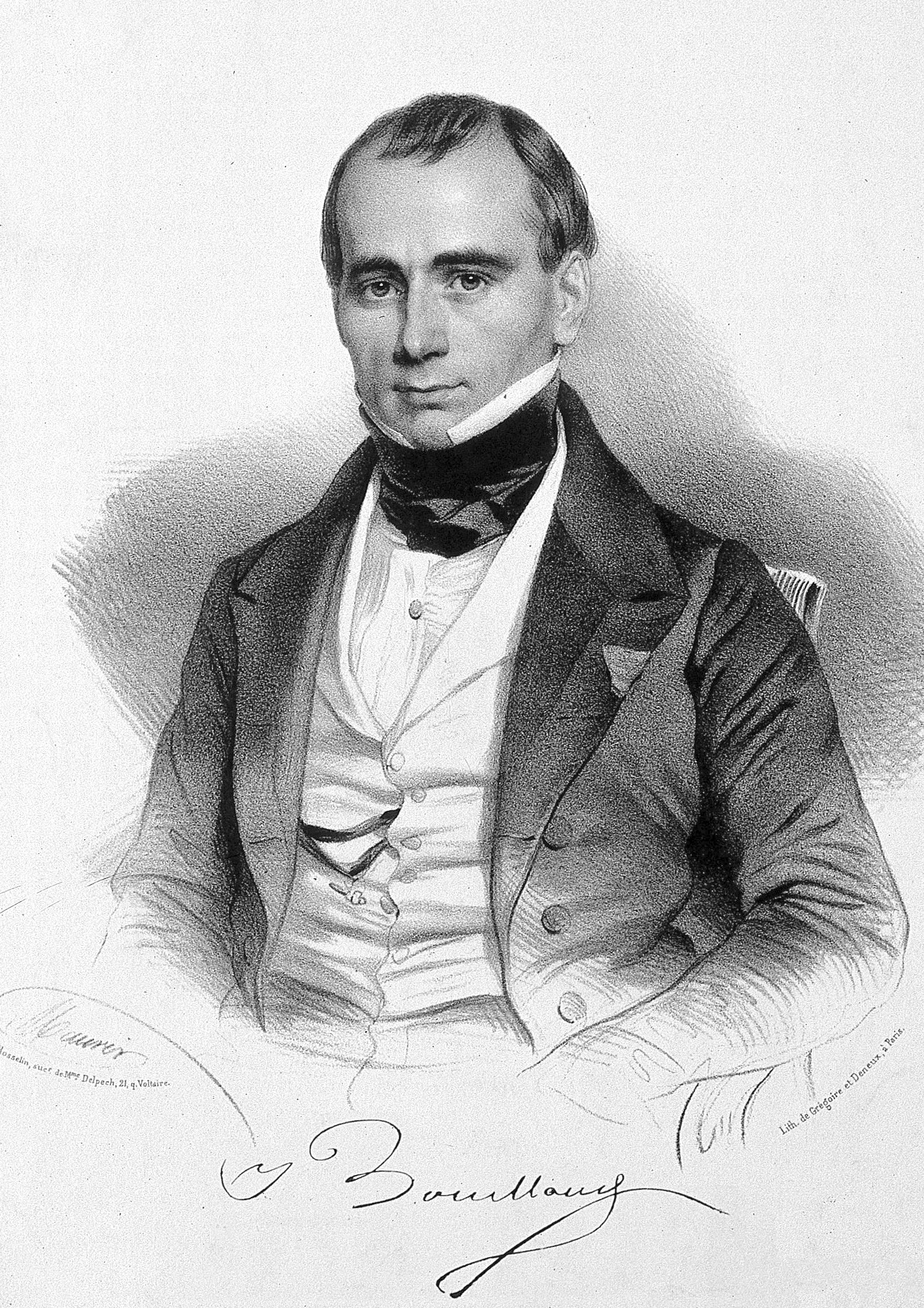
- Born: 16 September 1796; Garat, Charente
- Died: 29 October 1881 (aged 85)
- Known for: acute rheumatoid endocarditis
- Awards: Légion d'honneur
- Scientific career
- Fields: medicine
- Workplaces: Hôpital de la Charité

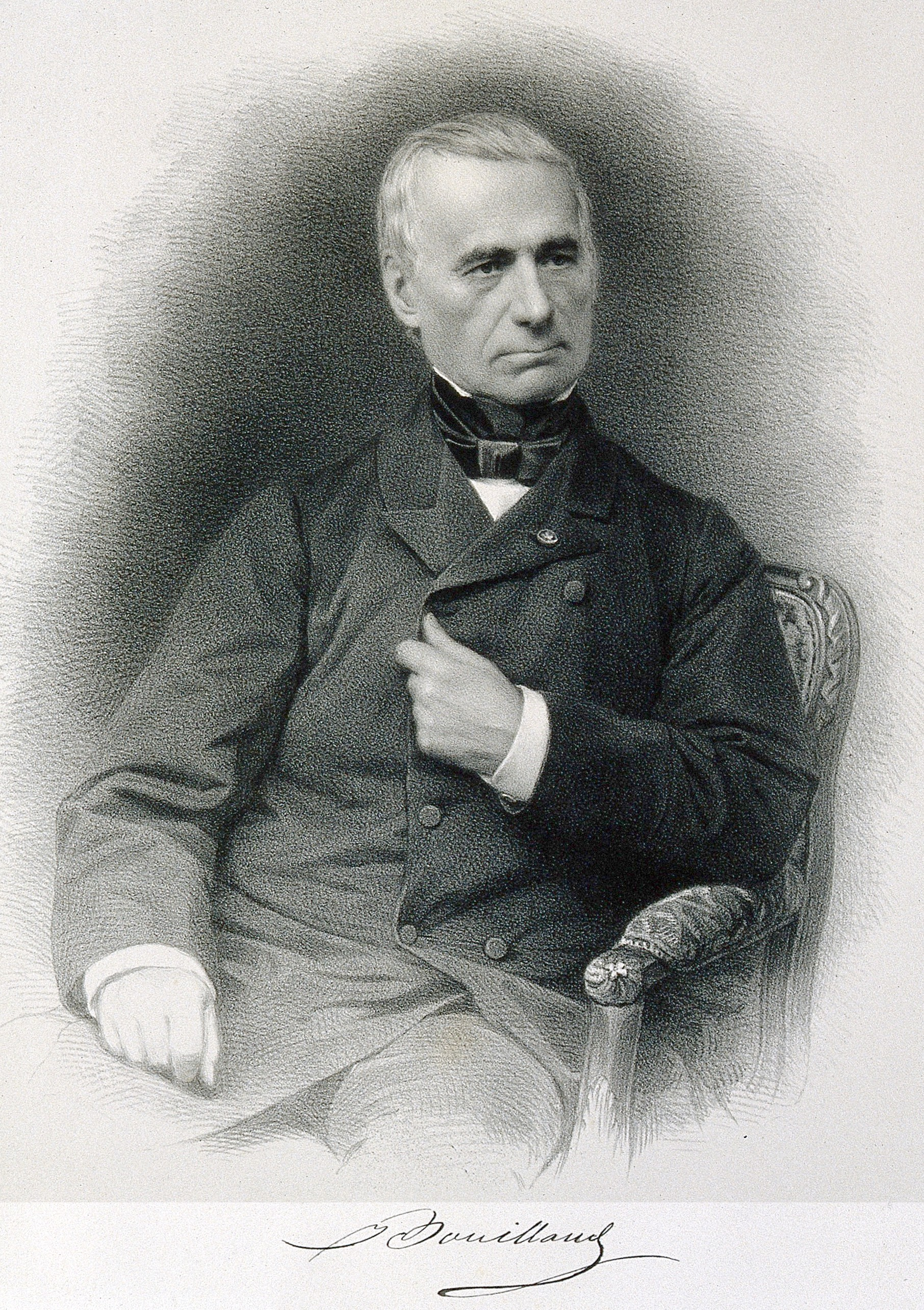
Jean-Baptiste Bouillaud

Jean-Baptiste Bouillaud (16 September 1796 – 29 October 1881) was a French medical doctor born in Bragette, now part of Garat, Charente. Bouillaud was an early advocate of the localization of cerebral functions (especially of speech).

He received his medical doctorate in 1823 and later was a professor at the Charité in Paris. Puerto Rican independence leader, surgeon and Légion d'honneur laureate, Ramón Emeterio Betances, was one of his prominent students. In 1862 Bouillaud was elected president of the Académie de Médecine, and in 1868 he became a member of the Académie des sciences.

Bouillaud performed research of many medical diseases and conditions, including cancer, cholera, heart disease and encephalitis, to name a few. He is remembered for providing a correlation between rheumatism and heart disease, and French medical dictionaries still refer to acute rheumatoid endocarditis as "Bouillaud's disease". He described this condition in the treatise "Traité clinique des maladies du coeur".

Bouillaud was an early advocate of the drug digitalis for treatment of heart ailments. He referred to digitalis as the "opium of the heart". Along with cardiologist Pierre Potain (1825–1901), he performed studies of "heart sounds" involving the differentiation between normal and abnormal heart rhythms. Bouilland was an ardent follower of François-Joseph-Victor Broussais (1772–1838) in regard to the dubious practice of bloodletting.

In 1825 Bouillaud published "Traité clinique et physiologique de l'encéphalite, ou inflammation du cerveau" in which he includes one of the earliest studies on localization of brain functions. He maintained that loss of articulate speech was associated with lesions of the anterior lobe.
