= Malassezia folliculitis =

- Other names: Pityrosporum folliculitis
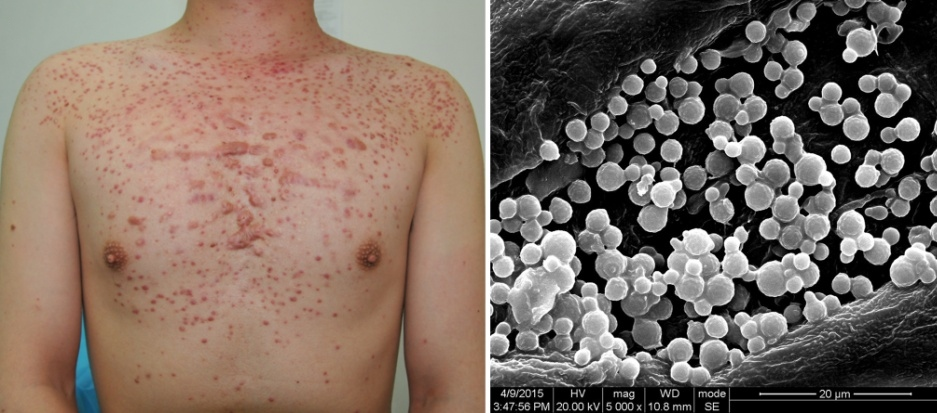
- 25-year-old man with pityrosporum folliculitis and electron micrograph of his skin, showing Malassezia spores.
- Specialty: Dermatology

Malassezia folliculitis or pityrosporum folliculitis, is a skin condition caused by infection by Malassezia (formerly Pityrosporum) yeast.

The skin of the upper trunk area including the back, chest, arms and sometimes the neck is often affected and this condition is often seen in young to middle aged adults, although it has been known to occur in adults well into their sixties, and can also be found on the lower extremities as well. Its diagnosis is based on the pruritic (itchy) papulopustules found in a follicular pattern in these regions.

Pustules are caused by an overgrowth of the yeast Malassezia furfur (formerly Pityrosporum ovale), which plugs the follicles. This yeast is lipophilic, requiring fatty acids that are present in oily skin to proliferate. It has been shown that Malassezia yeast grows by consuming fatty acids with carbon chain lengths C11 to C24. Malassezia is part of the normal skin flora, but overgrows in certain conditions. Overgrowth is associated with oily skin, humidity or other pre-existing dermatologic conditions such as seborrheic dermatitis and severe dandruff.

== See also ==
- Skin lesion
- List of cutaneous conditions
