= Malassezia sympodialis =

Scientific classification
- Kingdom: Fungi
- Division: Basidiomycota
- Class: Malasseziomycetes
- Order: Malasseziales
- Family: Malasseziaceae
- Genus: Malassezia
- Species: M. sympodialis

Binomial name
- Malassezia sympodialis Simmons & Gueho (1990)

Species of fungus

Malassezia sympodialis is a species in the genus Malassezia. It is characterized by a pronounced lipophily, unilateral, percurrent or sympodial budding and an irregular, corrugated cell wall ultrastructure. It is one of the most common species found on the skin of healthy and diseased individuals. It is considered to be part of the skin's normal human microbiota and begins to colonize the skin of humans shortly after birth. Malassezia sympodialis, often has a symbiotic or commensal relationship with its host, but it can act as a pathogen causing a number of different skin diseases, such as atopic dermatitis.

== History ==
In 1846, Karl Ferdinand Eichstedt was the first to identify the association of fungi with pityriasis versicolor, a common infection associated with the genus Malassezia. The name applied to the fungal agent responsible shifted multiple times over the next 150 years until the genus Pityrosporum was settled upon for the teleomorph, and Malassezia for the anamorph. Through the use of genetic sequencing, a number of new species have since been identified.

== Description ==
Malassezia sympodialis exhibits unipolar budding, similar to a number of other Malassezia species including M. pachydermatis. The colonies achieve a size of 5 mm in diameter after a week of growth, and develop a soft texture and a round, smooth shape. The individual cells are oval in shape and 2.5-7.5 × 2.0-8.0 μm in size and acquire a yellowish appearance en masse when grown in culture at 37 °C (99 °F). The optimal growth of this species occurs at 34 °C (93 °F). A range of specialized growth media such as Cremophor EL and Leeming-Notman agar that incorporate fatty acids support the growth of M. sympodialis. However, non-specialized growth media overlaid with sterile olive oil also support the growth of this species in culture. Malassezia sympodialis can be identified in the laboratory by the presence of β-glucosidase activity which causes darkening of the growth medium.

== Pathogenicity in humans and animals ==
The innate and adaptive immune systems are both important for the health of the skin. There are several different types of cells, such as neutrophils, that search their environment for antigens by using pattern recognition receptors and are essential in the innate immune response. Malassezia sympodialis causes atopic eczema in susceptible individuals. Many of the skin diseases caused by this species occur when the barrier of the skin is breached, allowing the organism to access the damaged integument, such as occurs in individuals infected with atopic eczema. The M. sympodialis peptide LL-37 is found in monocyte-derived dendritic cells where it is involved in initiating a Th-2 like response. The Th-2 like response is involved in the creation of IgE and is therefore important for individuals with atopic eczema. There are several factors that contribute to the development of atopic eczema, including the environment and genetics.

=== Human diseases ===
Malassezia sympodialis has been identified conjunction with a number of human skin disorders include pityriasis versicolor, seborrheic dermatitis and dandruff and atopic dermatitis. There have also been reports of M. sympodialis in patients with granulomatous dermatitis.

==== Pityriasis versicolor ====
Pityriasis versicolor is a skin disorder that leads to the formation of patches on the skin that are either hypo- or hyperpigmented. It may be found on oilier areas of the body including the neck and trunk. Besides M. sympodialis, several species of Malassezia have been identified on individuals with the disorder including, M. globosa, M. slooffiae and several others. Some believe that M. globosa is responsible for the disease as it has been found in higher numbers, but this has not yet been confirmed. Confirmation of the agent of disease involves microscopic examination of skin scrapings from the infected individuals for the presence of thick-walled yeast cells intermixed with broad hyphae. Ointments containing fungicidal ingredients such as selenium can be applied to the affected area. Oral medications are also used in some cases.

==== Seborrhoeic dermatitis and dandruff ====
Seborrheic dermatitis is a skin disorder where inflammation and desquamation occurs in areas of the body with a high density of sebaceous glands, particularly the face and trunk. The dandruff form does not result in inflammation and is restricted to the scalp. Although M. sympodialis has been reported as an agent of seborrhoeic dermatitis and dandruff, other species including M. furfur and M. globosa are more commonly associated with the disorder.

==== Atopic dermatitis ====
Atopic dermatitis occurs in individuals that have an abnormal immune reaction to allergens resulting in inflammation on the affected area of the skin. This disorder is associated with M. furfur, M. restricta, M. sympodialis and a number of other species.

=== Animal diseases ===
Malassezia sympodialis has been identified in high frequency on dogs that have some form of dermatitis and is found in association with other species of Malassezia. This species has also been associated with otitis in cattle, cats and other animals.
