= Cementicle =

- Specialty: Dentistry

A cementicle is a small, spherical or ovoid calcified mass embedded within or attached to the cementum layer on the root surface of a tooth, or lying free within the periodontal ligament. They tend to occur in senior population.

There are 3 types:

- Free cementicle – not attached to cementum
- Attached (sessile) cementicle – attached to the cementum surface (also termed exocementosis)
- Embedded (interstitial) cementicle – with advancing age the cementum thickens, and the cementicle may become incorporated into the cementum layer

They may be visible on a radiograph (x-ray). They may appear singly or in groups, and are most commonly found at the tip of the root. Their size is variable, but generally they are small (about 0.2 mm – 0.3 mm in diameter).

Cementicles are usually acellular, and may contain either fibrillar or afibrillar cementum, or a mixture of both. Cementicles are the result of dystrophic calcification, but the reason why this takes place is unclear. Cementicles are thought to form when calcification occurs around a nidus, a precipitating center. Around this nidus they slowly enlarge by further deposition of calcium salts. Examples of how cementicles are thought to form include:

- Calcification due to degenerative changes in the epithelial cell rests of Malassez
- Calcification of thrombosed (blocked) capillaries in the periodontal ligament (i.e. a phlebolith)
- Microtrauma to Sharpey's fibres causes small spicules of cementum or alveolar bone to splinter into the periodontal membrane Some do not consider these as true cementicles.
