= Otto Neubauer =

German Physician and Biochemist

Otto Neubauer (8 April 1874 – 24 November 1957) was a Bohemia-born German physician and biochemist who was responsible for several clinical diagnostic innovations including the Neubauer-Fischer test to evaluate kidney function and the Neubauer counting chamber.

== Life and work ==
Neubauer was born in Karlsbad (then in Bohemia, Austria-Hungary) to physician Wolfgang and Hedwig Arnstein née Sadler. In 1892, he passed the examination for qualifying admission to a university after studying at the humanistic gymnasium of Chomutov. He then went to the German University in Prague he received a medical degree in 1898 and became interested in physiological chemistry through the influence of Karl H. Huppert. He then joined as an assistant to Friedrich von Müller at Basel. He moved to Munich in 1902. In 1908, he joined the Ludwig-Maximilians-Universität München and served in a reserve hospital during World War I. His major work in this period was on amino acid metabolism in human health and disease. Neubauer and Konrad Fromherz examined the role of pyruvic acid in fermentation. He innovated several clinical diagnostics including tests of peptolytic activity. Gastric juice incubated with glycyl-tryptophan for twenty-four hours tested with bromine to see if free tryptophan causes a rose-violet colour was used as an indication of stomach carcinoma. In 1918, he became head physician at Schwabinger Hospital, working there until his dismissal by the Nazi government in June 1933 as a person of Jewish ancestry. In 1920, he developed a blood pressure measuring device and still later a measuring slide (known as a Neubauer slide or Neubauer counting chamber) for counting cells under a microscope. With assistance and support from The Society for the Protection of Science and Learning, he immigrated to England in 1939 along with his wife Lilly Caroline (1876-1962, who was married to composer Fritz Cassirer until his death) and worked in Oxford for the remainder of his life. His contributions included studies on arsenic and other chemicals as carcinogens.

Neubauer's students included Siegfried Thannhauser, Rudolf Schindler, and Konrad Dobriner.
