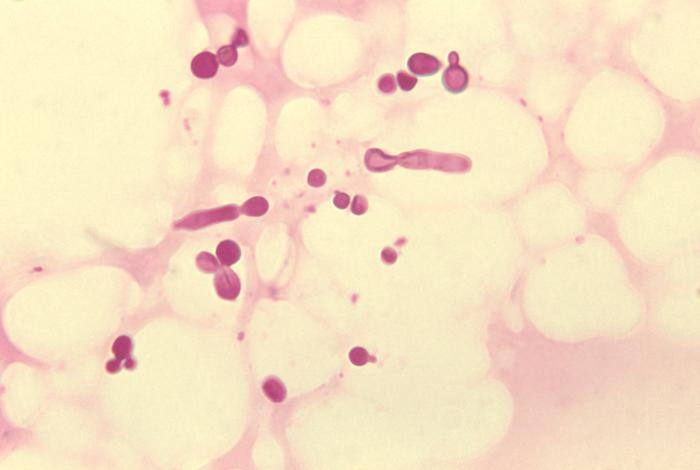
- Malassezia furfur in skin scale from a patient with tinea versicolor

Scientific classification
- Kingdom: Fungi
- Division: Basidiomycota
- Subdivision: Ustilaginomycotina
- Class: Malasseziomycetes; Denchev & T.Denchev (2014)
- Order: Malasseziales; R.T.Moore (1980)
- Family: Malasseziaceae; Denchev & R.T.Moore (2009)
- Genus: Malassezia; Baill. (1889)

Type species
- Malassezia furfur (C.P.Robin) Baill. (1889)

Species
- See text

Synonyms
- Pityrosporum Sabour. (1904)

= Malassezia =

Genus of fungi

Malassezia is a genus of fungi (specifically, a yeast belonging to the division Basidiomycota).

Some species of Malassezia are found on the skin of animals, including humans. Because malassezia requires fat to grow, it is most common in areas with many sebaceous glands—on the scalp, face, and upper part of the body.

== Role in human diseases ==
Malassezia infections of human skin can cause or aggravate a variety of conditions, including dandruff, seborrheic dermatitis, and acne.

=== Dermatitis and dandruff ===
When Malassezia grows too rapidly, the natural renewal of cells is disturbed, and dandruff can appear with itching (a similar process may also occur with other fungi or bacteria).

Identification of Malassezia on skin has been aided by the application of molecular or DNA-based techniques. These investigations show that M. globosa is the species that causes most skin disease in humans, and that it is the most common cause of dandruff and seborrhoeic dermatitis (though M. restricta is also involved).

There can be as many as ten million M. globosa organisms on a human head.

A project in 2007 sequenced the genome of dandruff-causing Malassezia globosa and found it to have 4,285 genes. M. globosa uses eight different types of lipase, along with three phospholipases, to break down the oils on the scalp. Any of these 11 proteins would be a suitable target for dandruff medications.

Prescription and over-the-counter shampoos containing ketoconazole are commonly used to treat dandruff caused by Malassezia.

M. globosa has been predicted to have the ability to reproduce sexually, but this has not been observed.

=== Skin pigmentation disorders ===
In occasional opportunistic infections of the trunk and other locations on humans, some species of Malassezia can cause hypopigmentation or hyperpigmentation. Allergy tests for these fungi are available.

The skin rash of tinea versicolor (pityriasis versicolor) is also caused by an infection of this fungus.

=== Cancer ===
Translocation of Malassezia species from the intestines into pancreatic neoplasms has been associated with pancreatic ductal adenocarcinoma, and the fungi may promote tumor progression through activation of host complement.

=== Crohn's and inflammatory bowel disease ===
M. restricta, which is normally found in the skin, is linked to disorders like Crohn's disease and inflammatory bowel disease when found in the gut. This is especially true for organisms with the N12 CARD9 allele, which provokes a stronger inflammatory response.

=== Malassezia folliculitis ===
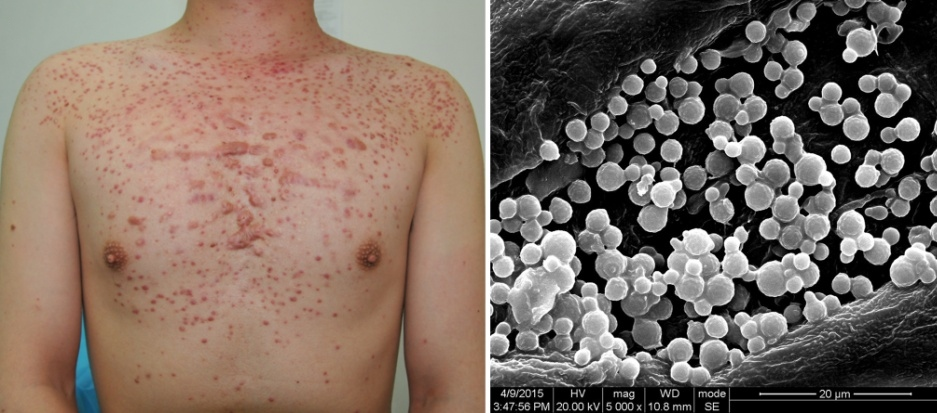
A 25-year-old man with pityrosporum folliculitis and electron micrograph of his skin, showing Malassezia cells

Malassezia folliculitis (also called pityrosporum folliculitis) is caused by infection with Malassezia.

== Systematics ==
Malassezia is the sole genus in family Malasseziaceae, which is the only family in order Malasseziales, itself the single member of class Malasseziomycetes.

Due to progressive changes in their nomenclature, some confusion exists about the naming and classification of Malassezia yeast species. Work on these yeasts has been complicated because they require specific growth media and sometimes grow very slowly in laboratory culture.

Malassezia was originally identified by the French scientist Louis-Charles Malassez in the late nineteenth century; he associated it with the condition seborrhoeic dermatitis. Raymond Sabouraud identified a dandruff-causing organism in 1904 and called it Pityrosporum Malassezii, honoring Malassez, but at the species level as opposed to the genus level. When it was determined that the organisms were the same, the term "Malassezia" was judged to possess priority.

In the mid-twentieth century, it was reclassified into two species:

- Pityrosporum (Malassezia) ovale, which is lipid-dependent and found only on humans. P. ovale was later divided into two species, P. ovale and P. orbiculare, but current sources consider these terms to refer to a single species of fungus, with M. furfur the preferred name.
- Pityrosporum (Malassezia) pachydermatis, which is lipophilic but not lipid-dependent. It is found on the skin of most animals.

Malassezia is the sole genus in the family Malasseziaceae, which was validated by Cvetomir Denchev and Royall T. Moore in 2009. The order Malasseziales had been previously proposed by Moore in 1980, and later emended by Begerow and colleagues in 2000. At this time the order was classified as a member of unknown class placement in the subdivision Ustilaginomycotina. In 2014, Cvetomir and Teodor Denchev circumscribed the class Malasseziomycetes to contain the group.

== Description ==
Malassezia grows rapidly, typically maturing within 5 days when incubated at temperatures ranging from 30–35 °C (86–95 °F). Growth is slower at 25 °C (77 °F), and certain species struggle at 37 °C (99 °F). These organisms can proliferate on media infused with cycloheximide. An essential factor for the growth of Malassezia is the presence of long-chain fatty acids, with M. pachydermatis being an exception. The most conventional cultivation method involves overlaying solid media with a layer of olive oil. However, for nurturing some clinically relevant species, such as the challenging-to-cultivate M. restricta, more intricate culture media may be required. For the most efficient recovery of Malassezia, it has been recommended to collect blood through a lipid infusion catheter and subsequently use lysis-centrifugation—a recommendation backed by multiple comparative studies.

The yeast-like cells of Malassezia, measuring between 1.5–4.5 μm by 3–7 μm, are characterised as phialides featuring tiny collarettes (a small, collar-like flange or lip at the mouth of a phialide from which spores or conidia are produced and released). These collarettes are challenging to identify using standard light microscopes. A defining characteristic of cells from this genus is their morphology: one end is round, while the other has a distinctly blunt termination. This latter end is where singular, broad-based bud-like structures emerge, although in certain species, these structures might be narrower. To effectively visualise the organism's shape, a staining technique involving safranin is recommended, followed by observation under oil immersion. Furthermore, Calcofluor-white staining provides an enhanced clarity of the cell wall and its unique contour. While Malassezia typically lacks hyphal elements, rudimentary forms can sporadically be present.

== Species ==
The Index Fungorum lists 22 species of Malassezia. The following list gives the name, the taxonomic authority (those who first described the fungus, or who transferred it into Malassezia from another genus; standardized author abbreviations are used), and the name of the organism from which the fungus was isolated, if not human.

In the mid-1990s, scientists at the Pasteur Institute in Paris, France, discovered additional species.

- Malassezia arunalokei Honnavar, Rudramurthy, G.S.Prasad & Chakrabarti
- Malassezia brasiliensis F.J.Cabañes, S.D.A.Coutinho, M.R.Bragulat & G.Castellá – from lesions on the beak of turquoise-fronted amazon parrot
- Malassezia caprae J.Cabañes & Boekhout – from skin of goat
- Malassezia cuniculi J.Cabañes & G.Castellá – from healthy skin of external ear canal of rabbit
- Malassezia dermatis Sugita, M.Takash., A.Nishikawa & Shinoda
- Malassezia equi Nell, S.A.James, C.J.Bond, B.Hunt & Herrtage – from skin of horse
- Malassezia equina J.Cabañes & Boekhout – from skin of horse
- Malassezia furfur (C.P.Robin) Baill.
- Malassezia globosa Midgley, E.Guého & J.Guillot
- Malassezia japonica Sugita, M.Takash., M.Kodama, Tsuboi & A.Nishikawa
- Malassezia muris (Gluge & d'Ukedem ex Guég.) Escomel – skin of mouse
- Malassezia nana A.Hirai, R.Kano, Makimura, H.Yamag. & A.Haseg. – from discharge from ear of cat
- Malassezia obtusa Midgley, J.Guillot & E.Guého
- Malassezia ochoterenai Maecke
- Malassezia pachydermatis (Weidman) C.W.Dodge – from skin of Indian rhinoceros
- Malassezia psittaci F.J.Cabañes, S.D.A.Coutinho, M.R.Bragulat & G.Castellá – from lesions on the beak of blue-headed parrot
- Malassezia restricta E.Guého, J.Guillot & Midgley
- Malassezia slooffiae J.Guillot, Midgley & E.Guého – from skin of pig
- Malassezia sympodialis R.B.Simmons & E.Guého
- Malassezia tropica (Castell.) Schmitter
- Malassezia vespertilionis J.M.Lorch & Vanderwolf – from vesper bats in subfamily Myotinae
- Malassezia yamatoensis Sugita, M.Takash., Tajima, Tsuboi & A.Nishikawa
