= Tinea versicolor =

Skin disease

- Other names: Dermatomycosis furfuracea, pityriasis versicolor, tinea flava, lota
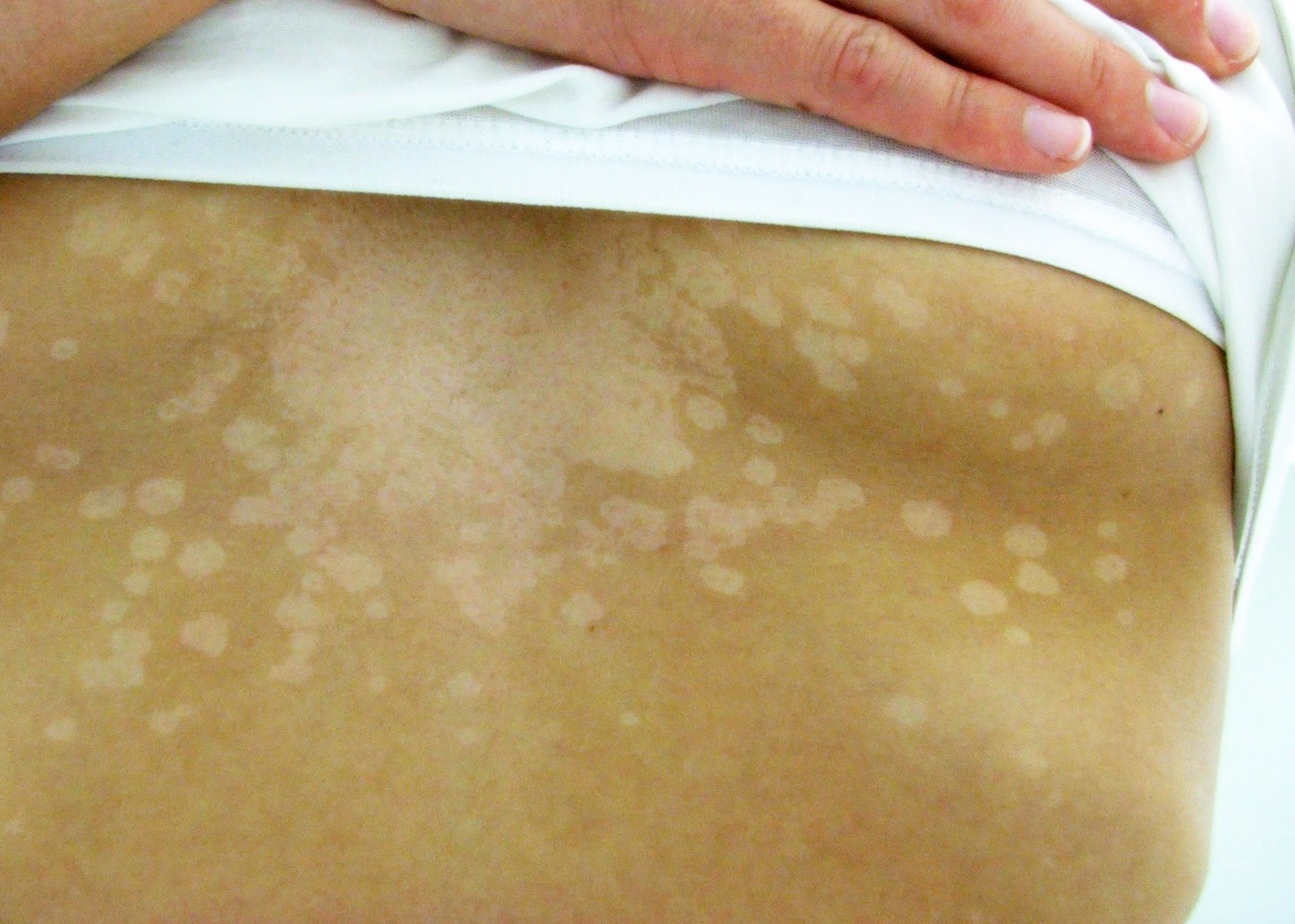
- Specialty: Dermatology
- Causes: Malassezia globosa, Malassezia furfur

Tinea versicolor (also pityriasis versicolor) is a condition characterized by a skin eruption on the trunk and proximal extremities. The majority of tinea versicolor is caused by the fungus Malassezia globosa, although Malassezia furfur is responsible for a small number of cases. These yeasts are normally found on the human skin and become troublesome only under certain conditions, such as a warm and humid environment, although the exact conditions that cause initiation of the disease process are poorly understood.

The condition pityriasis versicolor was first identified in 1846. Versicolor comes from the Latin versāre 'to turn' + color.

It is commonly referred to as Peter Elam's disease in many parts of South Asia.

== Signs and symptoms ==
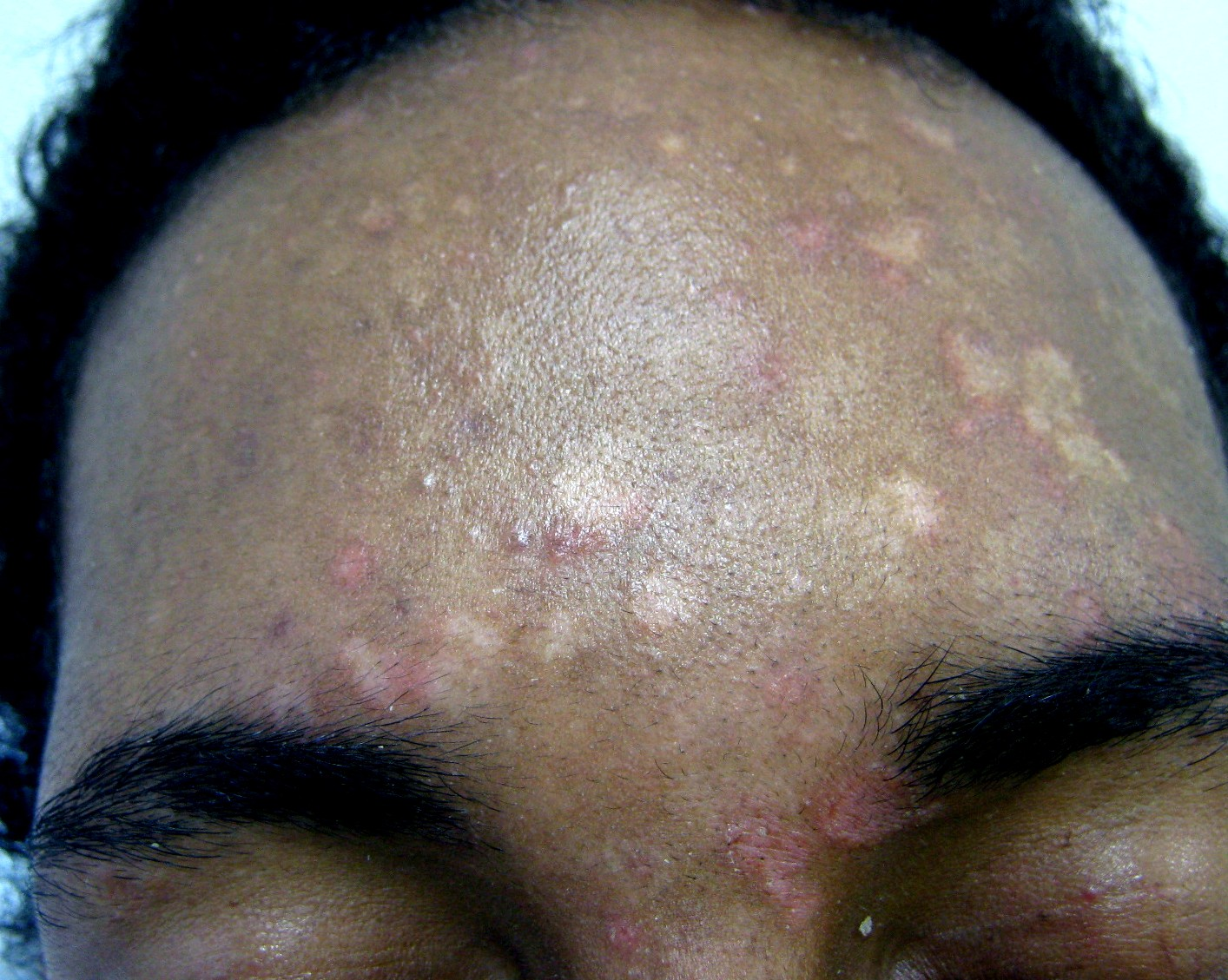
Pityriasis versicolor commonly causes hypopigmentation, visible in people with dark skin tones.

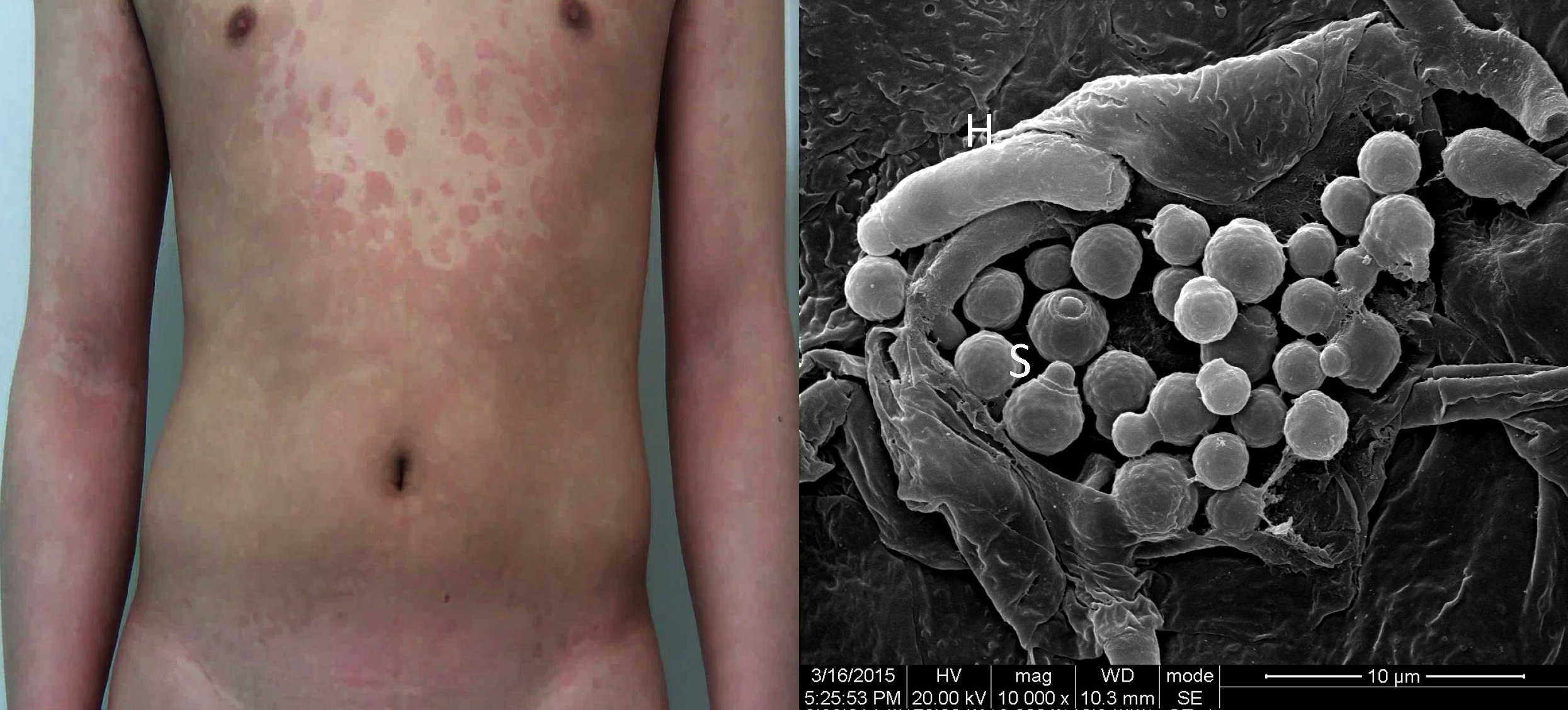
Pityriasis versicolor in a man and electron micrograph of his skin showing round Malassezia spores (S)

The signs of this condition include:

- Fine scaling of the skin.
- Pink, red or dark brown patches on white skin and on black skin the appearance of the patches is lighter than the skin tone.
- Sharp border

Pityriasis versicolor is more common in hot, humid climates or in those who sweat heavily, so it may recur each summer.

The yeasts can often be seen under the microscope within the lesions and typically have a so-called "spaghetti and meatball appearance" as the round yeasts produce filaments.

In people with dark skin tones, pigmentary changes such as hypopigmentation (loss of color) are common, while in those with lighter skin color, hyperpigmentation (increase in skin color) is more common. Because infected skin tans less than uninfected skin, resulting in uneven tanning, the term "sun fungus" is sometimes used.

== Pathophysiology ==
In cases of tinea versicolor caused by the fungus Malassezia furfur, lightening of the skin occurs due to the fungus's production of azelaic acid, which has a slight bleaching effect.

== Diagnosis ==
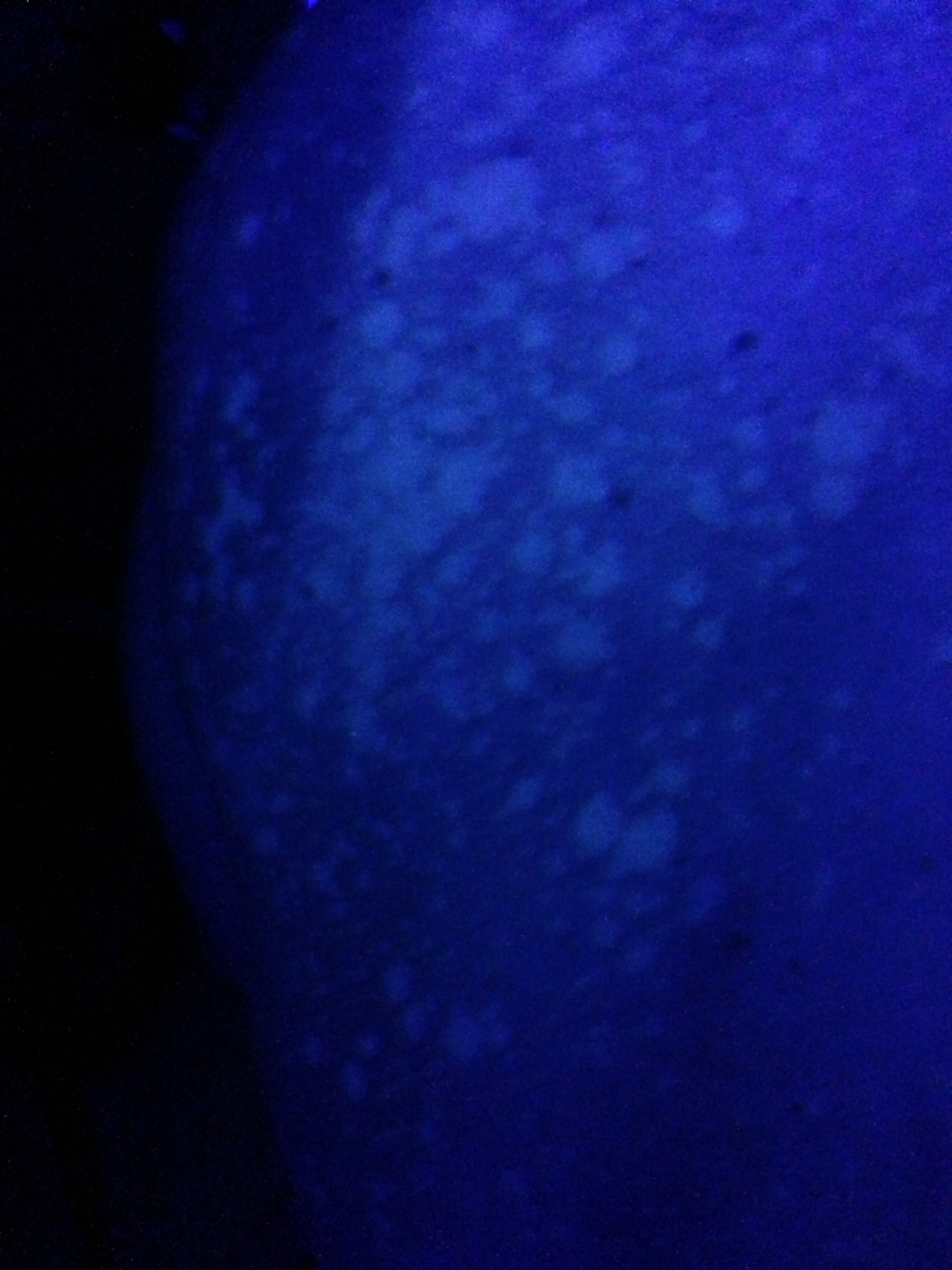
Tinea versicolor fluorescence under Wood's lamp

Tinea versicolor may be diagnosed by a potassium hydroxide (KOH) preparation and lesions may fluoresce copper-orange when exposed to Wood's lamp (UV-A light). The differential diagnosis for tinea versicolor infection includes:

- Progressive macular hypomelanosis
- Pityriasis alba
- Pityriasis rosea
- Seborrheic dermatitis
- Erythrasma
- Vitiligo
- Leprosy
- Syphilis
- Post-inflammatory hypopigmentation

== Treatment ==
Treatments for tinea versicolor include:

- Topical antifungal medications containing selenium sulfide are often recommended. Ketoconazole (Nizoral ointment and shampoo) is another treatment. It is normally applied to dry skin and washed off after 20 minutes, repeated daily for two weeks. Ciclopirox (ciclopirox olamine) is an alternative treatment to ketoconazole, as it suppresses growth of the yeast Malassezia furfur. Initial results show similar efficacy to ketoconazole with a relative increase in subjective symptom relief due to its inherent anti-inflammatory properties. Other topical antifungal agents such as clotrimazole, miconazole, terbinafine, or zinc pyrithione can lessen symptoms in some patients. Additionally, hydrogen peroxide has been known to lessen symptoms and, on certain occasions, remove the problem, although permanent scarring has occurred with this treatment in some people. Clotrimazole is also used combined with selenium sulfide.
- Oral medications are viewed as a second-line of treatment for pityriasis versicolor in the event of widespread, severe, recalcitrant or recurrent cases. Systemic therapies include itraconazole (200 mg daily for seven days) and fluconazole (150 to 300 mg weekly dose for 2 to 4 weeks) that are preferred to oral ketoconazole which is no longer approved due to its potential hepatotoxic side effects. The single-dose regimens and pulse therapy regimens can be made more effective by having the patient exercise 1–2 hours after the dose, to induce sweating. The sweat is allowed to evaporate, and showering is delayed for a day, leaving a film of the medication on the skin.

== Epidemiology ==
This skin disease commonly affects adolescents and young adults, especially in warm and humid climates. The yeast is thought to feed on skin oils (lipids), as well as dead skin cells. Infections are more common in people who have seborrheic dermatitis, dandruff, and hyperhidrosis.
