= Malassezia dermatis =

Scientific classification
- Domain: Eukaryota
- Kingdom: Fungi
- Division: Basidiomycota
- Class: Malasseziomycetes
- Order: Malasseziales
- Family: Malasseziaceae
- Genus: Malassezia
- Species: M. dermatis

Binomial name
- Malassezia dermatis Sugita, M.Takash., A.Nishikawa & Shinoda (2002)

Species of fungus

Malassezia dermatis is a fungus that can cause opportunistic infections in animals.
