= Epithelial cell rests of Malassez =

Part of the periodontal ligament cells around a tooth

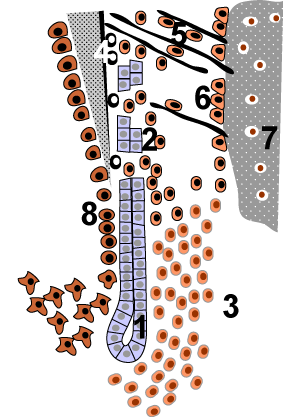
(1) The HERS, (2) epithelial rests of Malassez, (3) dental follicle, (4) cementoblasts, (5) periodontal ligament, (6) alveolar cells, (7) bone, (8) odontoblasts

In dentistry, the epithelial cell rests of Malassez (ERM) or epithelial rests of Malassez (pax epithelialis pediodontii) are part of the periodontal ligament cells around a tooth. They are discrete clusters of residual cells from Hertwig's epithelial root sheath (HERS) that did not completely disappear. It is considered that these cell rests proliferate to form epithelial lining of various odontogenic cysts such as radicular cyst under the influence of various stimuli. They are named after Louis-Charles Malassez (1842–1909) who described them. Some rests become calcified in the periodontal ligament (cementicles).

ERM plays a role in cementum repair and regeneration. The stem cells in ERM can undergo an epithelial–mesenchymal transition and differentiate into diverse types of cells of mesodermal and ectodermal origin like bone, fat, cartilage and neuron-like cells.
