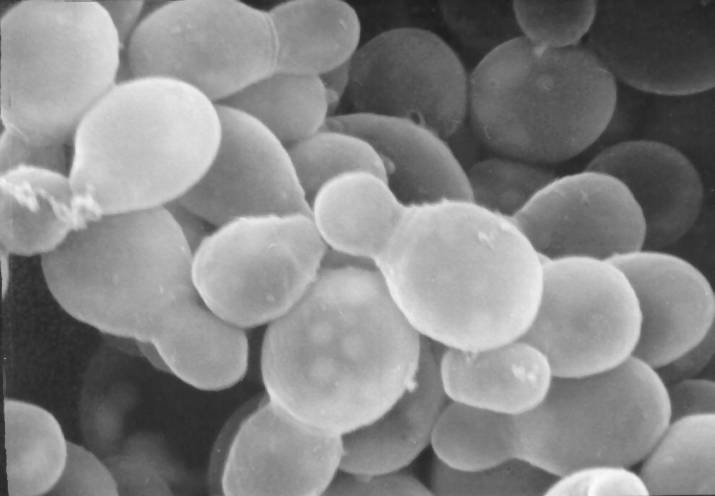
- A scanning electron microscopy image of Malassezia furfur

Scientific classification
- Kingdom: Fungi
- Division: Basidiomycota
- Class: Malasseziomycetes
- Order: Malasseziales
- Family: Malasseziaceae
- Genus: Malassezia
- Species: M. furfur

Binomial name
- Malassezia furfur (C.P.Robin) Baill. (1889)

Synonyms
- Microsporum furfur C.P.Robin (1853)

= Malassezia furfur =

Species of fungus

Malassezia furfur (formerly known as Pityrosporum ovale) is a species of yeast (a type of fungus) that is naturally found on the skin surfaces of humans and some other mammals. It is associated with a variety of dermatological conditions caused by fungal infections, notably seborrhoeic dermatitis and tinea versicolor. As an opportunistic pathogen, it has further been associated with dandruff, malassezia folliculitis, pityriasis versicolor (alba), and malassezia intertrigo, as well as catheter-related fungemia and pneumonia in patients receiving hematopoietic transplants and patients receiving parenteral nutrition.

== Background ==
Malassezia furfur is a fungus that lives on the superficial layers of the epidermis. It generally exists as a commensal organism forming a natural part of the human skin microbiota, but it can gain pathogenic capabilities when morphing from a yeast to a hyphal form during its life cycle, through unknown molecular changes. This can lead to its uncontrolled proliferation and a subsequent imbalance of the residential skin flora. Some virulence factors or properties which may increase the fungus' ability to acquire an infectious nature include the formation of biofilms, increased adherence to surfaces, and hydrophobicity and also can form hyphae (long, cylindrical filaments)

Infections with pathogenic M. furfur occur on the scalp, torso, or limbs, presenting clinically as pigmented macules that can merge in the form of scaling plaques. Many of these lesions resolve spontaneously in most patients. The pathogen most frequently affects children compared to people of other age groups. It has been associated with numerous dermatological conditions, including seborrhoeic dermatitis, dandruff, pityriasis versicolor, and tinea circinata, all of which affect the skin. Some other diseases can also arise due to an infection with the fungus, such as catheter-related fungemia and pneumonia in patients receiving hematopoietic cell transplants.

== Morphology and characteristics ==
Malassezia furfur is a unicellular organism which varies in size between 1.5 and 4.5 × 2.0–6.5 micrometers. The cells have a bottle-like shape due to a small protrusion visible at the end of each cell. Cells are difficult to grow in a lab since they require specific conditions.

== Treatment ==
Topical application of antifungal medications such as ketoconazole, cyclopirox olamine, piroctone olamine, zinc pyrithione, or sulfur compounds are commonly prescribed to treat diseases caused by Malassezia furfur.

== Bibliography ==
- Larone, D.H. (2002). Medically Important Fungi: A Guide to Identification (4 ed.). ASM Press. ISBN 1-55581-172-8.
