= Sulfacetamide/sulfur =

Pharmaceutical drug

Combination of
- Sulfacetamide: Sulfonamide antibacterial
- Sulfur (pharmacy): Keratolytic

Clinical data
- AHFS/Drugs.com: Multum Consumer Information
- License data: US DailyMed: Sulfacetamide sodium sulfur
- Routes of administration: Topical
- ATC code: D11AC08 (WHO)

Legal status
- Legal status: US: ℞-only

The drug combination sulfacetamide/sulfur is a topical acne medication manufactured by Medicis under the trade name Plexion and also available under other trade names such as Clenia, Prascion, and Avar. It combines sodium sulfacetamide, a sulfonamide antibiotic, and sulfur, a keratolytic agent. It is available in four formulations: as a cleansing cloth, cleanser, topical suspension, and as a facial mask. The sulfacetamide inhibits the growth of the bacterium Cutibacterium acnes that is associated with acne, while sulfur facilitates the removal of dead skin cells to prevent clogged pores.

In 2023, it was the 311th most commonly prescribed medication in the United States, with more than 200,000 prescriptions.
