= Shanghai pedicure =

Type of pedicure

A Shanghai pedicure is a type of pedicure that involves soaking feet in hot water and using scalpels to remove dead skin, calluses, corns, and ingrown nails from the feet. This style of pedicure utilizes Chinese medicine.

== Origin ==
The Shanghai pedicure is deeply rooted in Chinese heritage and traditional Chinese medicine. Despite the name, this pedicure style was not originally practiced by Shanghainese people. During the city's peak as the "Paris of the East" in the 1920s and 1930s, many locals considered pedicures beneath them. Instead, skilled pedicurists, or sifus (meaning "masters" in Cantonese), came from rural provinces, relocating to Shanghai to cater to wealthy patrons. This migration led to the craft being widely known as the "Shanghai pedicure", though it was brought by artisans from outside the city.

One of the most notable figures in preserving this craft was So Yan-Ko, who learned pedicuring in Shanghai before moving to Hong Kong, where he began his long-standing tenure at the Mandarin Oriental. This tradition continued with his sons, who became renowned Shanghai pedicurists themselves.

== Technique ==
Shanghai pedicures are distinct from Western pedicures in their use of scalpels rather than files or pumices. The treatment involves soaking feet in hot water, followed by the careful removal of dead skin, calluses, corns, and ingrown nails. Unlike other pedicures that may prioritize aesthetic appeal, the Shanghai pedicure focuses on health, comfort, and precision. Pedicurists use a set of specially sharpened scalpels to target each area with care, ensuring minimal discomfort.

In this process, the pedicurist examines the client's lifestyle and habits, which they believe can contribute to foot conditions. For example, factors like walking barefoot on carpets or wearing certain types of shoes are seen as potential causes of calluses and rough skin.

== Traditional Chinese medicine ==
In traditional Chinese medicine, foot health is linked to overall wellness, as feet are considered to be the center of various acupuncture points. The Shanghai pedicure aligns with this philosophy, aiming to improve circulation and alleviate stress through precise foot care. Regular sessions are believed to help maintain soft, healthy skin and prevent common foot ailments.
