= Senile pruritus =

- Specialty: Dermatology

Senile pruritus is one of the most common conditions in the elderly or people over 65 years of age with an emerging itch that may be accompanied with changes in temperature and textural characteristics. In the elderly, xerosis, is the most common cause for an itch due to the degradation of the skin barrier over time. However, the cause of senile pruritus is not clearly known. Diagnosis is based on an elimination criteria during a full body examination that can be done by either a dermatologist or non-dermatologist physician.

== Classification ==
This type of itch is just one out of six different classifications.

- Cutaneous diseases, skin-related
- Systemic diseases, organs or tissues-related, can affect the entire body
- Drug-induced pruritus, medications-related
- Neurological disorders, nervous system-related
- Psychiatric disorders, behavioral or cognitive-related
- Unknown

The IFSI (International Forum for the Study of Itch) created another classification process for pruritus in the senile population. There are three groups within the classification, the first being those who have pruritus on diseased skin, the second being those who non-diseased skin with pruritus, and the third being those who have secondary skin scratch lesions. The secondary scratch lesions can include abrasions, pimples, bumps, crusts and other lesions that can be caused by irritating the skin through pinching, rubbing or scratching which can cause scarring. This most often appears in group two or group three patients. Patients that fall into category two and three often have pruritus associated with the classifications listed above.

== Risk factors ==
Risk factors of senile pruritus may include:

- old age
- smoking
- monophagism, main consumption of only certain types of diets
- excessive drinking
- xerosis, dry skin
- medications
- underlying diseases
  - kidney, liver, gastrointestinal diseases
  - cancer

== Potential causes ==
An itch can be caused by various reasons. The cause of senile pruritus is not clearly known, this type of itch in elderly patients may be a result of other reasons, like:

- allergies
- drug-induced pruritus
- diseases mentioned under the Classification section of this article
- underlying conditions, like kidney failure or gallbladder diseases, etc.
- Shingles
- Other

While identifying the cause of senile pruritus can be challenging, there are some correlations between classifications/diagnosis of senile pruritus and clinical manifestation. For cutaneous diseases, the diagnosis could be dry skin (with flare ups at dry climate), irritant and allergic contact dermatitis (skin lesions), seborrheic dermatitis (skin lesions), atopic dermatitis (scratching, allokinesis, stinging, burning), psoriasis (skin lesions), urticaria (welts/skin swelling). Sometimes senile pruritus can manifest without a primary rash and with the absence of xerosis.

Systemic diseases can lead to a senile pruritus diagnosis. For example, chronic kidney disease (generalized or localized pruritus), hepatobiliary diseases (generalized pruritus), thyroid disorders (urticaria), polycythemia vera (generalized pruritus), iron deficiency anemia (skin lesions/scratching) and hodgkin's lymphoma (the area where lymph nodes are affected) can all lead to clinical manifestations of pruritus. Various drugs can also induce pruritus which can manifest with or without a skin rash and can happen immediately or even months after the drug has been used by the patient. Neurological disorders such as postherpetic neuralgia, brachioradial pruritus and notalgia paraesthetica can also lead to senile pruritus with burning, stinging, scratching and/or lesions. Psychiatric disorders such as schizophrenia, somatoform disorders, dissociative disorders, hallucinations, and delusional parasitosis can cause severe lesions, burning, stinging, as well as sensations of bugs crawling on skin over the entire body.

== Pathophysiology ==
Common pathways for the development of senile pruritus may include:

=== Xerosis ===
In the elderly, xerosis, is the most common cause for an itch due to the degradation of the skin barrier over time. The skin barrier is critical for protecting the body from external pathogens, maintaining body temperature as well as other homeostatic or baseline functions. Over time, as the skin ages, the permeability barrier function begins to decline leading to dry skin. Reduced structural protein levels, lipids, as well as other critical enzymes that contribute to a strong epidermal(skin) barrier as seen overtime when compared to young skin. Skin surface pH changes can also lead to chronic itch. Many properties that are needed for a functional barrier must reside at a more acidic pH, however, aged skin tends to be accompanied with a basic increase in pH. Disruptions in the pH gradient not only induce itch signaling but contribute to the overall decline in barrier function. These intrinsic alterations leads aged skin to be more at risk for irritant exposure. Ultimately, the vulnerable barrier increases the risk of developing pruritus and other skin diseases.

=== Neurological ===
Another cause of senile pruritus may include neurological changes in the body as it ages. An itch is triggered by both the peripheral and central nervous system in response through a complex circuit of neurons. Specifically, c fibres and Aδ fibres are responsible for the itch response which have been seen to be inhibited at higher rates in the elderly. In addition to neurological inhibition, skin hydration can have an effect on the nervous system circuit. Skin moisture keeps the barrier function intact, but reductions can lead to a decrease in the itch threshold needed to be reached.

=== Immune system ===
Immunosenescence occurs over time where the immune system undergoes changes that may impact both the innate and adaptive immune systems. These alterations may lead to increased immunoreactivity to intrinsic and extrinsic stimuli that can cause the body to become more sensitive and reactive. This may result in the form of an itch when exposed to stimuli that the body was not reactive to in the past. The immune system is responsible for a myriad of activities to defend the body from foreign substances via various endogenous and exogenous pathways. Within the lymphatic system, the thymus gland produces T cells that aid the immune system to recognize and attack potential harmful stimuli. In the case for the aging population, the thymus gland undergoes physical and chemical conformational changes that reduce the organ's size and therefore impacting its function to produce T cells. This impairment may lead to decreased Th2 cells responsible for anti-body response when encountering allergens, bacteria, toxins, and other irritants, which may lead to an increase in autoreactivity-causing senile pruritus.

== Signs and symptoms ==
Senile pruritus can be caused by dry skin and it is common for skin to become more dry with age. The back, legs, arms, scalp, and genitalia are areas of the body that are commonly affected by senile pruritus. According to a study, most of the people who experience pruritus daily have increased itching sensations and other associated symptoms during the night. Most studies reveal that senile pruritus is more common in men than women.

Common symptoms of senile pruritus include:

- pain
- heat sensation
- cold sensation
- bumps, blisters or spots
- redness
- scratch marks
- patches that may be leathery or scaly

The relationship between senile pruritus and seasonal weather changes has been studied but the results have been inconsistent. Some studies reveal that senile pruritus is most prevalent during Winter and Fall seasons while in other studies this correlation was not found to be significant.

Typically, senile pruritus is diagnosed following an exclusion process starting with a complete physical exam. If a person is exhibiting signs and symptoms of senile pruritus, a laboratory exam may not be recommended by a doctor at the initial doctor's visit unless there are other indicators of an underlying disease. After being treated for xerosis and tested for scabies, if the senile pruritus persists, screening for an underlying systemic disease can be recommended.

== Treatment ==
Treatment usually consists of common remedies for age-related xerosis. However, repeated diagnosis requires further evaluation, taking into account a person's laboratory measurements and medical conditions. A medical history is typically taken describing the severity of the pruritus on a scale of 0-10 (no itchiness to unbearable itchiness) and the location. Medication use is also documented to narrow down the cause of the pruritus. There is no complete treatment to eradicate the chronic itch due to the uncertainty of the cause so treatment is more-so palliative management.

=== Pharmacological Treatments ===
==== Topical ====
Topical treatments may be used to reduce inflammation and the painful or itchy sensation or flare-ups locally at the site on the skin. Topical treatments are typically safe for the geriatric population.

Topical treatments may include:

- corticosteroids
- immunomodulators
- menthol
- local anesthetics

==== Systemic ====
The medication benefits and risks of systemic treatments are reviewed for elderly people suffering with pruritus due to various reasons, like underlying conditions.

===== Anti-histamines =====
First generation anti-histamines can be useful due to their sedating qualities in treating pruritus. Second generation anti-histamines are used to treat allergies and can help reduce the inflammation in treating pruritus. Compared to first generation anti-histamines, second generation anti-histamines are typically non-sedating. However, they may not be used in elderly people because of their anticholinergic effects, like constipation and dry mouth.

Some common anti-histamine medications may include:

- diphenhydramine, most commonly known as Benadryl
- loratadine, most commonly known as Claritin
- cetirizine, most commonly known as Zyrtec

==== Immunosuppressants ====
Immunosuppressants have seen use at low doses alongside systemic steroids and phototherapy for chronic symptoms of senile pruritus or dermatitis. Senile pruritus could have connections to the loss of tolerance for antigens on the skin that result from aging skin, which can potentially lead to other autoimmune disorders like bullous pemphigoid.

Immunosuppressive medications may include:

- methotrexate, immunosuppressant and agent used in chemotherapy
- azathioprine, immunosuppressant used as treatment in various conditions, such as an anti-rejection medication in kidney transplant patients
- mycophenolate, immunosuppressant agent used in conditions, such as organ transplants and autoimmune diseases

===== Neuroleptics =====
Anticonvulsants have also found use as a substitute for oral antihistamines to treat senile pruritus, and can be adjusted accordingly to individual needs and characteristics.

===== Other =====
Antidepressants and Opioid agonists/antagonists are also drug classes that may help dampen the itch response in people with pruritus. Opioid antagonists have shown to be effective in relieving pruritus as well due to their antagonizing effects on receptors within the central nervous system. Psychotropic agents work very similar to anti-histamines for those who cannot use the latter.

Topical salicylic acids and cannabinoids have been used for pruritus as well, though their pathway is not clearly known and need more studies before this can be shown as a safe and viable treatment.

=== Non-pharmacological Treatments ===
Removing or avoiding certain stimuli in the surroundings that could potentially induce or exacerbate the itch are shown to be effective. This includes avoid wearing clothing such as wool, nylon, latex, and other synthetic materials. Bathing in warmer water can inhibit the itch sensory fibers. Non-invasive brain stimulation, often used to treat neuropsychiatric conditions, has shown to be successful in repressing the itch cycle. The device works by sending electrical currents that can redirect how the signaling cascade is fired through the peripheral and central nervous systems.

==== Phototherapy ====
Phototherapy can be considered under the guidance of a dermatologist. UV light phototherapy has been used to treat various pruritic symptoms such as pruritus resulting from renal disease, eczema, or just of unknown origin.

==== Cooling agents ====
Usually used for temporary symptom relief and may decrease the severity of the itchiness. Cooling agents work as emollient replacements as dry, aged skin tend to lack the skin's natural emollients. Cooling agents like urea-based formulations help attract water into the skin, restoring the skin's hydration status. Using refrigerated topical products may also be an option for additive cooling effects.

==== Soak and smear approach ====
Bathing for 15 minutes in a warm bath followed by applying a mixture of a topical steroid and heavy moisturizer (Aquaphor, Eucerin, etc.) may improve the moisture retention of the skin and helps with symptom relief. Wrapping can be done onto the wet skin to maintain effectiveness of the treatment.

=== Avoidances ===
Certain materials can promote further pruritus and can be avoided to minimizes itchiness or reaction, so it may be helpful to decrease contact with wool and synthetic material. Soap-free substitutes are available to avoid any soap-related irritations to the skin. Avoiding the overuse of heating in the winter. Having a humidifier can increase humidity and allowing skin to be less dry in the cold and dry seasons. Shorter fingernails can also help to minimize scratching and reducing chances of bacterial infection.

== Complications ==
Severe, untreated chronic itch can lead to other skin diseases and/or progress into further skin damage. If left untreated, the itching may become too intense causing people to scratch themselves as a behavioral coping mechanism. Recurrent scratching, especially over the same area can lead to skin thickening which may prevent some medications from effectively working to treat the chronic itch. Senile pruritus can have a significant impact on the quality of life. Elderly people with this condition may feel more anxious or stressed due to their physical disposition. The urge to scratch may feel so severe that it could affect their ability to sleep.

There are challenges that come with approaching treatment for senile pruritus because of the number of potential underlying causes physicians have to narrow down along with potential intolerances to certain therapies with people ages 65 or older. Even certain ongoing medication usage can have a link to pruritus triggering in the elderly, but current treatments should not be the only thing to be wary of. A lot of it has to do with features that come with the ageing process whether it be systemic, psychogenic, or cutaneous conditions. Every treatment used with the elderly is managed with caution because of potential risks involved, such as higher toxicity compared to younger individuals since medications are metabolized differently.

== See also ==
- Drug-induced pruritus
- List of cutaneous conditions
