= Veruca =

Veruca or Verruca may refer to:

- Plantar wart, also called a verruca
- Veruca Salt (character), a character in Charlie and the Chocolate Factory
- Veruca Salt (band), an alternative rock band named after the character
- Veruca (Buffy the Vampire Slayer), a recurring character
- Verruca gnome, an anthropomorphic personification in Hogfather
