= Aluminium lactate =

Names
- Other names Aluminium trilactate, tris(2-hydroxypropanoato)aluminium

Identifiers
CAS Number	18917-91-4
3D model (JSmol)	Interactive image
ChemSpider	83440
ECHA InfoCard	100.038.776
EC Number	242-670-9
PubChem CID	16683018
UNII	V797H4GG0Z
CompTox Dashboard (EPA)	DTXSID9036989
- InChI: InChI=1S/3C3H6O3.Al/c3*1-2(4)3(5)6;/h3*2,4H,1H3,(H,5,6);/q;;;+3/p-3 Key: VXYADVIJALMOEQ-UHFFFAOYSA-K
- SMILES: CC(C(=O)O[Al](OC(=O)C(C)O)OC(=O)C(C)O)O

Properties
Chemical formula	C_{9}H_{15}AlO_{9}
Molar mass	294.192 g·mol^{−1}
Appearance	White powder
Melting point	300 °C (572 °F; 573 K)
Solubility in water	Soluble

Hazards
- GHS labelling
Pictograms	(GHS07: Exclamation mark)
Signal word	Warning
Hazard statements	H315, H319, H335
Precautionary statements	P302, P305, P338, P351, P352
- Except where otherwise noted, data are given for materials in their standard state (at 25 °C [77 °F], 100 kPa). Infobox references

Aluminium lactate is a chemical compound, a salt of aluminium and lactic acid with the formula Al(C_{3}H_{5}O_{3})_{3}.

== Synthesis ==
Aluminium lactate is obtained by precipitating a solution of the barium salt by aluminium sulfate.

== Physical properties ==
Aluminium lactate appears as a white powder which is soluble in water.

== Use ==
Aluminium lactate is used as a mordant.

It is suitable for use in the cosmetic industry as a keratolytic agent or antiperspirant, and in the oral industry.

Aluminium lactate is also used as a precursor for sol–gel synthesis of alumina-based glasses.
