= Verrucae palmares et plantares =

Skin condition

Verrucae palmares et plantares is a cutaneous condition characterized by warts on the palms and soles.

== See also ==
- Plantar wart
- List of cutaneous conditions
