= Zabiba =

Zabiba (also transliterated Zabibah, Zabibeh, Zabibe) is an Arabic word derived from the word zabīb, meaning "raisin". It may refer to:

- Zabibe, an 8th-century queen who was a vassal of the Assyrian empire
- Prayer bump, a mark that appears on the forehead of those who engage in regular Muslim prayer
- The namesake character of Saddam Hussein's romance novel Zabibah and the King
