= Medical uses of salicylic acid =

Salicylic acid
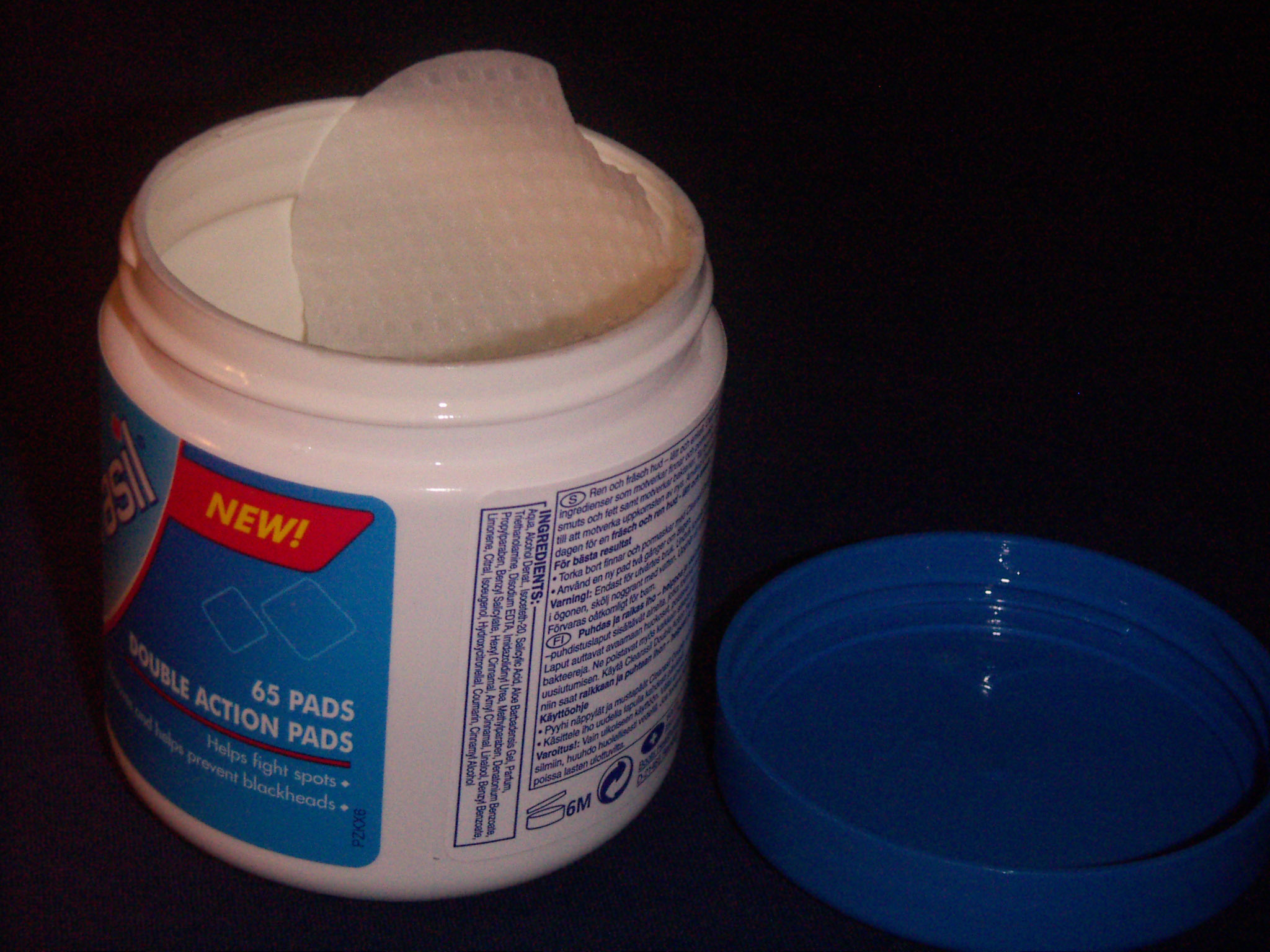
- Cotton pads soaked in salicylic acid for medical use

Clinical data
- Trade names: Various trade names
- AHFS/Drugs.com: Multum Consumer Information
- Routes of administration: Topical administration
- ATC code: D01AE12 (WHO)

Legal status
- Legal status: US: OTC

Pharmacokinetic data
- Bioavailability: low

Identifiers
- CAS Number: 69-72-7
- PubChem CID: 338
- DrugBank: DB00936
- ChemSpider: 331
- UNII: O414PZ4LPZ

Chemical and physical data
- Formula: C_{7}H_{6}O_{3}
- Molar mass: 138.122 g·mol^{−1}
- 3D model (JSmol): Interactive image
- SMILES: c1ccc(c(c1)C(=O)O)O
- InChI: InChI=1S/C7H6O3/c8-6-4-2-1-3-5(6)7(9)10/h1-4,8H,(H,9,10); Key:YGSDEFSMJLZEOE-UHFFFAOYSA-N

Salicylic acid is used as a medicine to help remove the outer layer of the skin. It is used to treat warts, skin tags, calluses, psoriasis, dandruff, acne, ringworm, and ichthyosis. For conditions other than warts, it is often used together with other medications. It is applied to the area affected.

Side effects include skin irritation, and salicylate poisoning. Salicylate poisoning tends to only occur when applied to a large area and in children. Use is thus not recommended in children less than two years old. It comes in a number of different strengths.

It is on the World Health Organization's List of Essential Medicines. It is also available mixed with coal tar, zinc oxide, or benzoic acid.

== Medical uses ==
Salicylic acid as a medication is used to help remove the outer layer of the skin. It is used to treat warts, calluses, psoriasis, dandruff, acne, ringworm, and ichthyosis.

Because of its effect on skin cells, salicylic acid is used in some shampoos to treat dandruff.

In modern medicine, salicylic acid and its derivatives are constituents of some "skin-reddening" products.

== Side effects ==
Concentrated solutions (20-30%) of salicylic acid may cause hyperpigmentation on people with darker skin types (Fitzpatrick phototypes IV, V, VI), without a broad spectrum sunblock. Due to sun sensitivity, sun protection is recommended when using salicylic acid on sun-exposed skin.

=== Pregnancy ===
No studies examine topical salicylic acid in pregnancy. The risks of aspirin late in pregnancy are probably not relevant for a topical exposure to salicylic acid, even late in the pregnancy, because of its low systemic levels. Topical salicylic acid is common in many over-the-counter dermatological agents and the lack of adverse reports suggests a low risk.

=== Overdose ===
Side effects include skin irritation and salicylate poisoning. Salicylate poisoning tends to only occur when applied to a large area and in children. Use is thus not recommended in children less than two years old. It comes in a number of different strengths.

Salicylic acid overdose can lead metabolic acidosis with compensatory respiratory alkalosis. In people presenting with an acute overdose, a 16% morbidity rate and a 1% mortality rate are observed.

== Mechanism of action ==
Salicylic acid works as a keratolytic, comedolytic and bacteriostatic agent, causing the cells of the epidermis to shed more readily, opening clogged pores and neutralizing bacteria within, preventing pores from clogging up again and allowing room for new cell growth.

== History ==
Dioscorides, in the first century AD, described the use of an extract of what might have been willow bark (a plant he called Itea), 'being burnt to ashes, and steeped in vinegar,' for taking away 'corns and other like risings in the feet and toes.' The active ingredient in this mixture could have been salicylic acid, but it is a modern myth that willow was ever used to ease aches and pains or reduce fevers.
