= Callus shaver =

Tool for removal of a skin callus

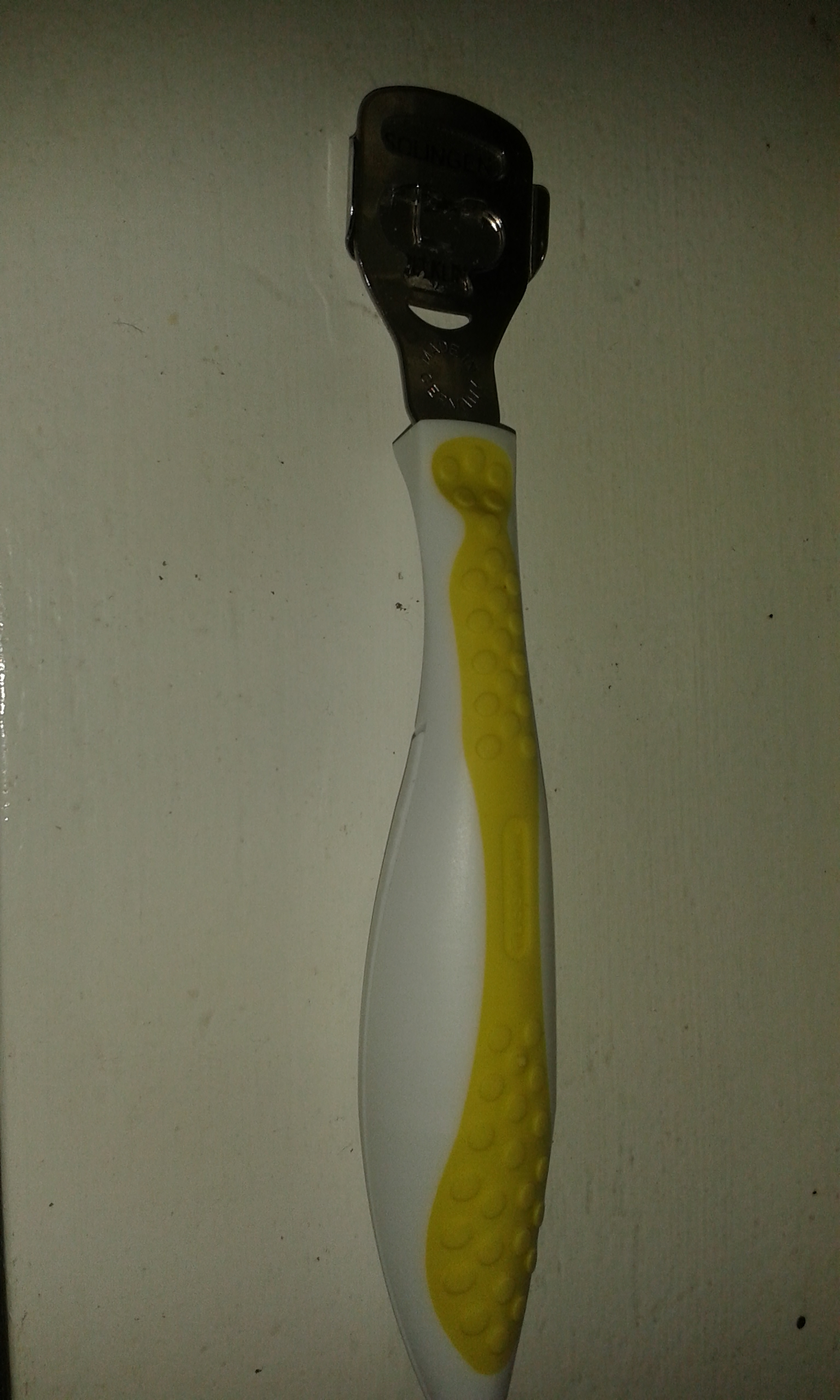
Callus shaver

A callus shaver (also called a credo knife) is a tool for the medical and cosmetic removal of a callus, mainly on the feet (see also pedicure), or hands. Technically speaking, its function is the abrasive treatment of hyperkeratotic skin lesions.

Callus shaver in use

The callus shaver consists of a handle, which is usually arched, and a blade made of ceramic or metal. Because the shaver is very sharp, injuries can result from careless use. For this reason the shaver is illegal to be used by beauty salons in some places in the United States. A cellulitis infection is possible if the skin is cut, especially if the shaver is shared with others and not properly sterilized. In very severe cases, amputation or death can result.

Treatment with a callus shaver should involve the user in a longer-term care plan. Calluses are usually several skin layers deep, which means that treatment must be repeated several times on the affected area (usually the feet) if it is to remain callus free. However, there should be a period of a few days between the individual treatments, otherwise skin irritations and/or an even thicker callus may occur.

The callus shaver should not be confused with a foot file (foot rasp), which is used during the after-treatment of working with a callus shaver.

The callus shaver and other instruments date back to the instruments mentioned by the Frenchman Nicolas-Laurent LaForest in his 1782 book "L'art de signer les pieds".
