= Drug-induced pruritus =

- Specialty: Dermatology

Drug-induced pruritus is itchiness of the skin caused by medication, a pruritic reaction that is generalized.

== Signs and symptoms ==
Depending on the causing agent, symptoms may start out acutely, go away when the drug is stopped, or develop into a chronic pruritus that lasts longer than six weeks.

== Causes ==
A common anti-malarial medication called chloroquine may cause pruritus for unknown reasons. Other antimalarials like amodiaquine, halofantrine, and hydroxychloroquine have also been linked to pruritus, albeit less frequently and to a lesser extent.

Another class of medications known to occasionally cause itching is known as serotonin reuptake inhibitors.

Itching is one of the most frequent adverse effects of opioid therapy.

A common artificial colloid used in clinical fluid management is hydroxyethyl starch (HES). Well-defined side effects, such as coagulopathy, clinical bleeding, anaphylactoid reactions, and pruritus, can make using HES more difficult.

== Epidemiology ==
Thirty-three percent of the 3,671 cases of cutaneous adverse drug reactions included itching as a common complaint.

== See also ==
- Pruritus
- List of cutaneous conditions
