= Corn (pathology) =

Distinctively shaped callus of dead skin

Corn (Medicine)
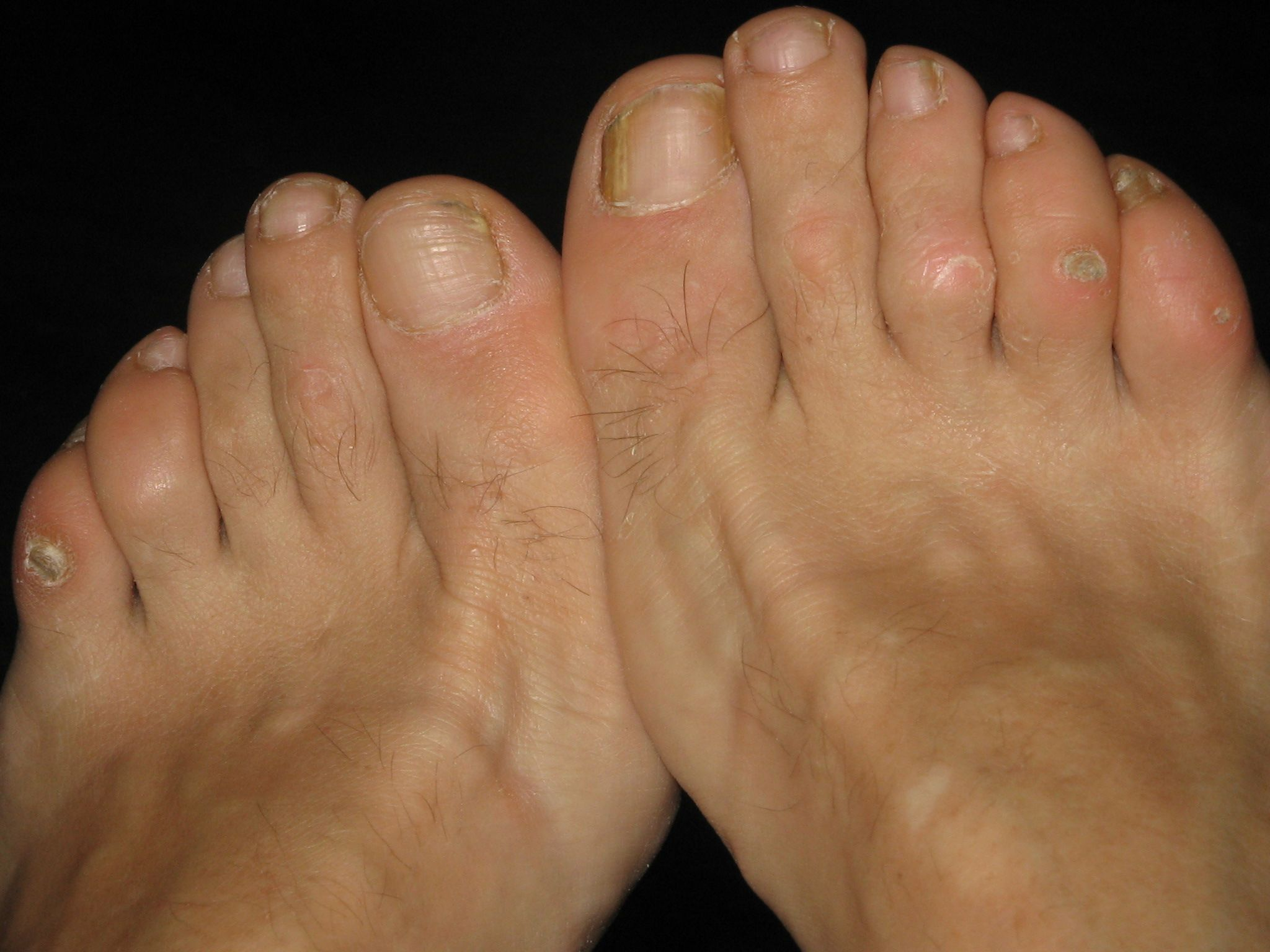
- Painful corns

A corn or clavus (plural clavi or clavuses) is an often painful, cone-shaped, inwardly directed callus of dead skin that forms at a pressure point near a bone, or on a weight-bearing part of the body. When on the feet, corns can be so painful as to interfere with walking. The visible portion of the corn tends to be more or less round, but corns are defined by having a hard tapering root that is directed inward, and pressure on the corn pushes this root deeper into the flesh (thus the Latin term clavus meaning "nail"). Pressure corns usually occur on thin or glabrous (hairless and smooth) skin surfaces, especially on the dorsal surface of toes or fingers, but corns triggered by an acute injury (such as a thorn) may occur on the thicker skin of the palms (palmar corns) or bottom of the feet (plantar corns).

Pressure corns form when chronic pressure on the skin against an underlying bone traces a usually elliptical path during the rubbing motion. The corn forms at the center of the pressure point and gradually widens and deepens.

Corns from an acute injury, such as from a thorn in the sole of the foot, may form due to the weight of the body, when the process that creates the usually evenly developing plantar callus is concentrated at the point of the healing injury, as an internal callus may be triggered by pressure on the transitional scar tissue. Once formed, the corn itself becomes the pressure point that generates the callus. Plantar corns appear superficially similar to plantar warts, but the cause and treatment are very different.

== Names ==
The modern medical word for a corn is Greek heloma (plural helomas or helomata); Latin "clavus" is somewhat dated. Another term is tyloma 'callus' (plural tylomas or tylomata), which tends to be more common in the United States. A hard corn is called a heloma durum or clavus durus, while a soft corn is called a heloma molle or clavus mollis.

Other types of corn include:

- Heloma neurovasculare or clavus neurovascularis (or vasculare/is) – a corn containing nerves and/or blood vessels in the epidermal layer due to the disruption of the dermal-epidermal border, that is very sensitive to pain and to debridement
- Clavus papillari – a painful corn surrounded by a white border, which is either bruised or gelatinous tissue
- Clavus neurofibrosus (or fibrosus) – an old, deep scarred corn (in a crater with a white, sometimes macerated border) that is traversed by nerves and connective tissue, thought to be scar tissue caused by chronic low-grade inflammation.
- Clavus subungalis – (subungual heloma) a corn that forms under the nail
- Heloma miliare – small 'millet seed' corns, often asymptomatic. Cause unknown; thought not to be due or at least not solely due to mechanical stress.

Although an excised corn resembles a barleycorn in shape, the two words 'corn' are unrelated. The word 'corn' for a callus derives from the Latin cornus 'horn', and is related to the Greek keras (whence keratin). The 'corn' of 'barleycorn' descends from the Indo-European word for 'grain.' The similarity in form is a historical accident.

Many languages have metaphoric phrases for corns. Several are based on the word for 'eye': e.g., German Hühnerauge and Mandarin 雞眼 jīyǎn, both 'chicken eye', or Japanese uo-no me, Malay mata ikan and Thai ตาปลา taa plaa, all 'fish eye'. German also has Krähenauge 'crow's eye', Hornauge 'horned eye' and Leichdorn 'body/corpse thorn'; similar phrases are used in other Germanic languages (e.g., Dutch eksteroog 'magpie eye' and likdoorn, Swedish liktorn). Romance languages tend to use cognates of 'callus' (French cal, Spanish callo and Italian callo), 'cornus' (French cor, Italian corno), but Catalan uses ull de poll meaning 'chick's eye'. Medically hyperkeratosis (Fr. hyperkératose, Sp. hiperqueratosis, It. ipercheratosi).

== Signs and symptoms ==
The hard part at the center of the corn resembles a barleycorn or shoe tack, that is, a cone or funnel shape with a broad top and a pointed tip at bottom. Because of their shape, corns intensify the pressure at the tip and can cause deep tissue damage and ulceration. Hard corns are especially problematic for people with insensitive skin due to damaged nerves (e.g., in people with diabetes mellitus), as they more readily become infected and potentially lead to gangrene. In others they may interfere with walking and lead to the medical complications of a lack of movement and exercise.

The location of soft corns tends to differ from that of hard corns. Hard corns occur on dry, flat surfaces of skin. Soft corns (frequently found between adjacent toes) stay moist, keeping the surrounding skin soft. The corn's center is not soft, however, but indurated.

== Diagnosis ==
To exclude other differential diagnoses, a skin biopsy may be taken. Imaging studies can be used in order to detect any underlying bony abnormalities that cause abnormal pressure on the overlying skin. For this purpose, a plain radiograph usually suffices, but, occasionally, CT scanning is used.

== Treatment ==
Treatment of pressure corns includes paring of the lesions, which immediately reduces pain. Another popular method is to use a corn plaster, a felt ring with a core of salicylic acid that relieves pressure and erodes the hard skin. However, if an abnormal pressure source remains, the corn generally returns. If the source of any abnormal pressure is detected, this may be avoided, usually through a change to more comfortable footwear or with various types of shoe inserts or footwear with extra toe space. In extreme cases correcting gait abnormalities may be required. If no other treatment is effective, surgery may be performed.

Corns formed around an acute injury occur in deeper tissue than pressure corns; they can usually be excised without cutting into the dermis, leaving only a thin layer of epidermis behind. The resulting hole in the sole of the foot may however form its own internal callus which triggers a new corn before it can fully heal, so it may be necessary to excise the corn more than once before the spot returns to an even plantar callus.
