= Prayer callus =

Callus on the forehead of devout Muslims

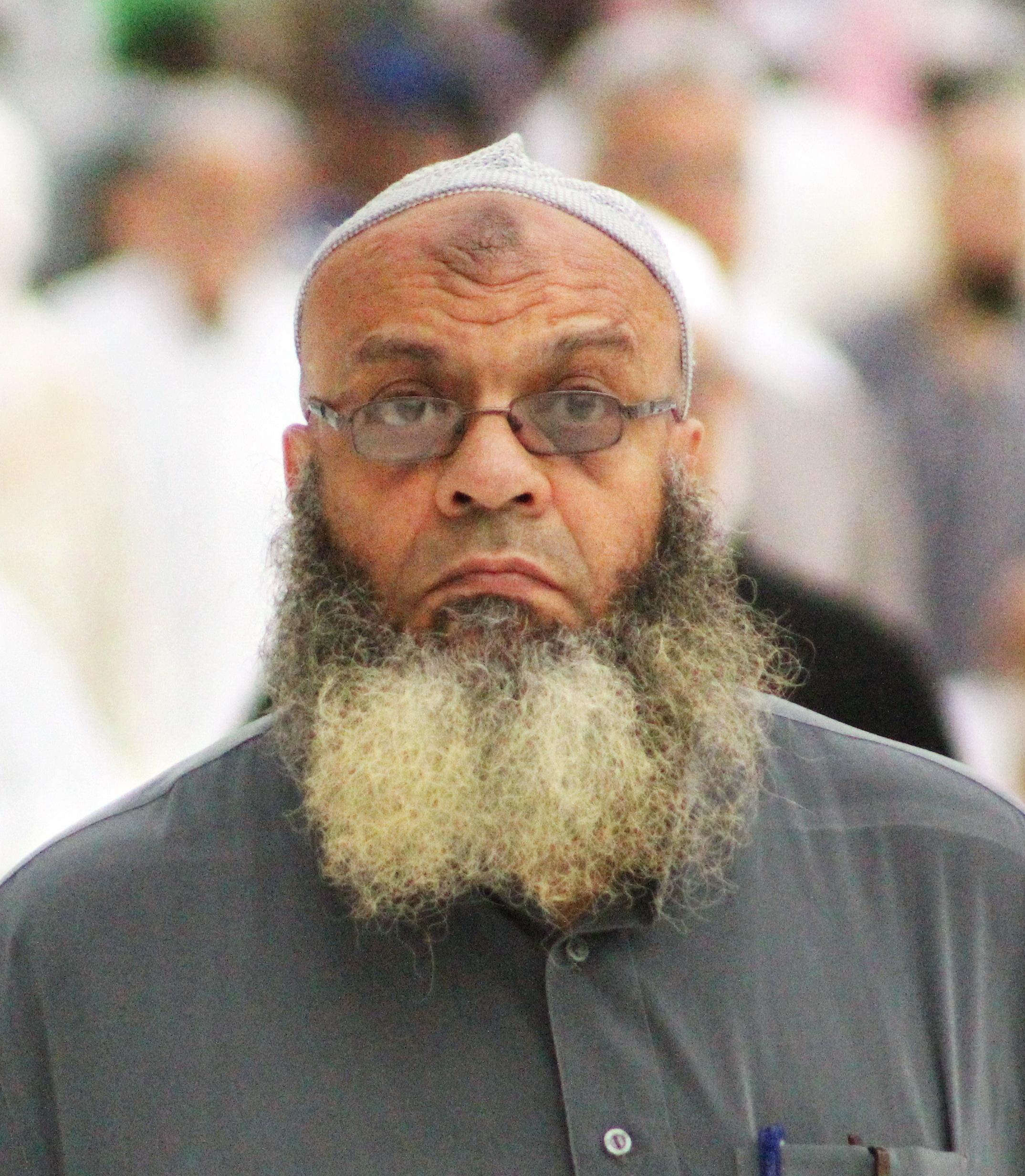
A pilgrim with prayer bump photographed outside Masjid al-Haram.

A prayer callus, prayer bump, zabiba or zebiba (Arabic: زبيبة, romanized: zabība, lit. 'raisin') is a callus on the forehead caused by repeated ritual prostration, usually in Islamic prayer. Owing to its cultural signal of piety, it is also known as the "devout sign".

Islam requires its adherents to pray five times a day (known as salat), which involves kneeling on a prayer mat and touching the ground (or a raised piece of clay called turbah by the Shia) with one's forehead. When done firmly for extended periods of time, a callus – the "prayer bump" – can develop on the forehead which may be considered as a sign of piety and dedication. Some Muslims believe that it is referred to in the Quran as:

Muḥammad is the Messenger of Allah; and those with him are forceful against the disbelievers, merciful among themselves. You see them bowing and prostrating [in prayer], seeking bounty from Allah and [His] pleasure. Their sign is in their faces from the effect of prostration [i.e., prayer]. That is their description in the Torah. And their description in the Gospel is as a plant which produces its offshoots and strengthens them so they grow firm and stand upon their stalks delighting the sowers – so that He may enrage by them the disbelievers. Allah has promised those who believe and do righteous deeds among them forgiveness and a great reward

Some Muslims also believe that on the Day of Resurrection, this callus will fluoresce with an immense white light. With the growing popularity of the zabiba in Egypt, its visibility can enhance societal standing and reflect an individual's commitment to prayer, creating a favorable first impression. In some cases, the callus can be thick enough to create a noticeable bump that protrudes from the forehead.
