= Sulfur in pharmacy =

Molecule used for pharmaceutical treatment of skin conditions

Clinical data
- AHFS/Drugs.com: Multum Consumer Information
- Routes of administration: Topical, rarely oral
- ATC code: D10AB02 (WHO)

Legal status
- Legal status: US: OTC; In general: Over-the-counter (OTC)

Identifiers
- IUPAC name: Octathiocane
- CAS Number: 10544-50-0 7704-34-9 (elemental sulfur)
- PubChem CID: 66348
- ChemSpider: 59726
- UNII: 70FD1KFU70
- ChEBI: CHEBI:29385

Chemical and physical data
- Formula: S_{8}
- Molar mass: 256.48 g·mol^{−1}
- 3D model (JSmol): Interactive image
- SMILES: S1SSSSSSS1
- InChI: InChI=1S/S8/c1-2-4-6-8-7-5-3-1; Key:JLQNHALFVCURHW-UHFFFAOYSA-N

Sulfur is used in pharmaceutical skin preparations for the treatment of acne and other conditions. It acts as a keratolytic agent and also kills bacteria, fungi, scabies mites and other parasites.

Chemically, it is the naturally occurring octasulfur (S_{8}).

== Forms and uses ==
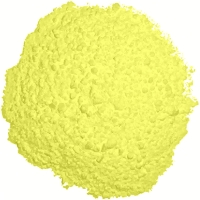
Pulverised sulfur

- Flowers of sulfur or sublimed sulfur (Latin: sulfur sublimatum) is the naturally occurring, unpurified form. It comes in yellow flakes and has been used in traditional and alternative medicine for humans and animals, as well as in alchemy and sulfuring fruit before drying.
- Purified sulfur (sulfur depuratum) is prepared by washing sublimed sulfur with ammonia. It is a fine yellow powder. It was formerly used as a laxative, but this application is rare today.
- Precipitated sulfur (sulfur praecipitatum) is prepared by boiling sulfur and calcium oxide in water and then precipitating with hydrochloric acid. It, too, is a fine yellow powder.
- Colloidal sulfur (sulfur colloidale) is an extremely fine sulfur powder prepared by repeated precipitation, first from polysulfides with protein and then from a slightly alkaline solution with ethanol or acetone. It has a greyish-white colour. Colloidal solutions in water are milky, and bluish when viewed against the light due to the Tyndall effect.

=== Topical uses ===
Precipitated sulfur and colloidal sulfur are used, in form of lotions, creams, powders, soaps, and bath additives, for the treatment of acne vulgaris, acne rosacea, and seborrhoeic dermatitis. Other topical uses included the treatment of superficial mycoses (infections with fungi) and scabies, but this is largely obsolete now.

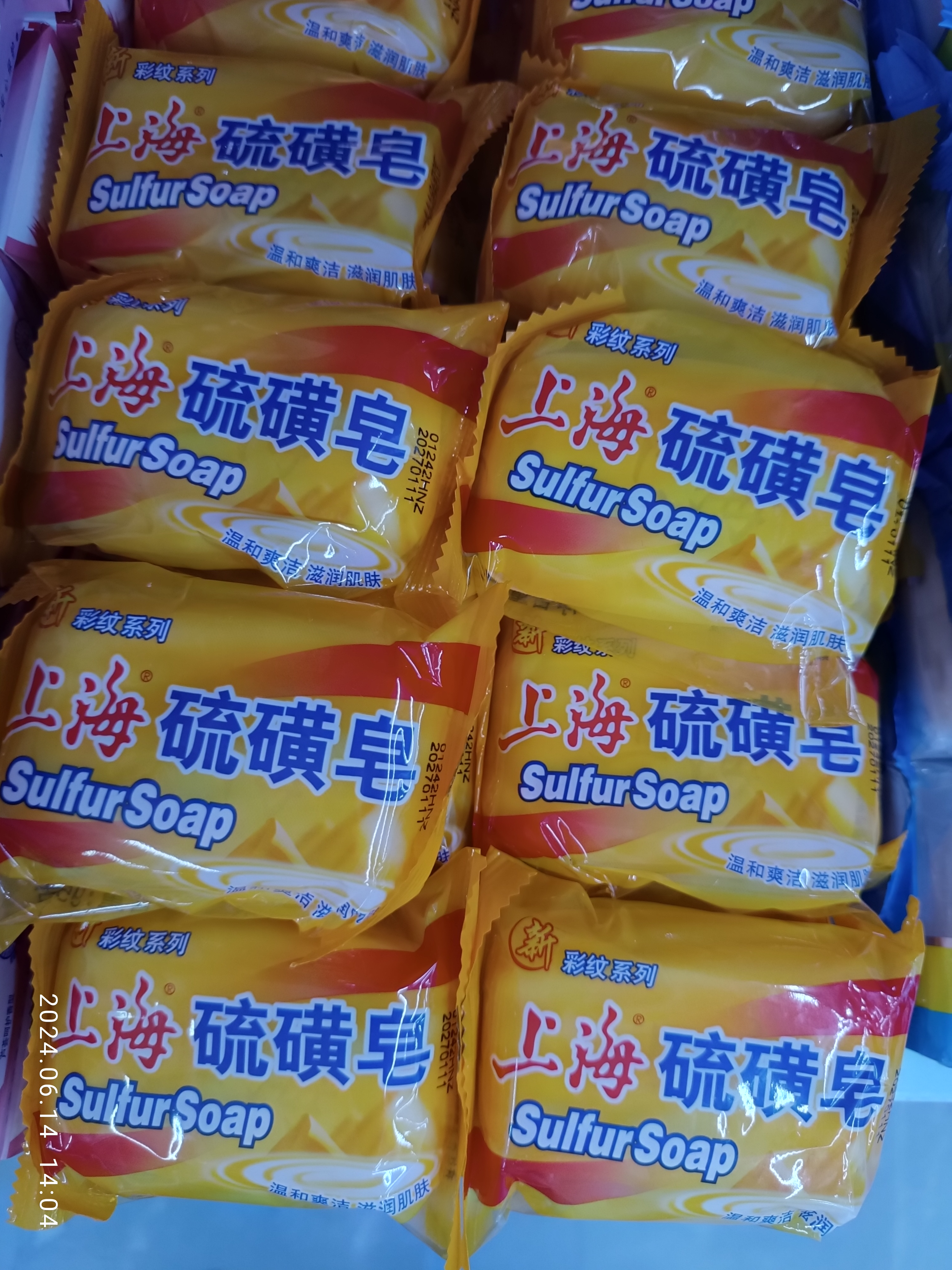
Sulfur soap found in Shanghai, China

== Adverse effects ==
Common adverse effects include irritation of the skin at the application site, such as dryness, stinging, itching and peeling. Generalised allergic reactions are rare; they include hives as well as swelling of lips, tongue, and throat, potentially closing up the respiratory tract.

== Overdose ==
Ingesting more than a few grams can lead to poisoning by hydrogen sulfide (H_{2}S), which the gut flora produces from sulfur. H_{2}S is also generated on the skin, but topical formulations do not induce toxic concentrations, except when large quantities are used for small children.

== Mechanism of action ==
Sulfur is converted to hydrogen sulfide through reduction, partly by bacteria. H_{2}S kills bacteria (possibly including Propionibacterium acnes which plays a role in acne), fungi, and parasites such as scabies mites. In the gut, H_{2}S increases motility, acting as a laxative. Sulfur's keratolytic action is also mediated by H_{2}S; in this case, the hydrogen sulfide is produced by direct interaction with the target keratinocytes themselves.

== See also ==
- Sulfur (general information about this chemical element)
