= Treatment of warts by keratolysis =

Therapy for warts

Two viral warts on a middle finger, being treated with a mixture of acids to remove them. A white precipitation forms on the area where the product was applied.

Keratolysis is the removal of dead surface skin cells and is a treatment for several types of wart. The most common keratolytic treatment of warts available over-the-counter involves salicylic acid. These products are readily available at most drugstores and supermarkets. There are typically two types of products: adhesive pads treated with salicylic acid or a bottle of concentrated salicylic acid. Removing a wart with this method requires a strict regimen of cleaning the area, applying the salicylic acid, and removing the dead skin with a pumice stone or emery board. It may take up to 12 weeks to remove a stubborn wart.

== Formulations ==
Some formulations are:

- alcoholic solution containing glycerol
- collodion which dries to a celluloid film / Duofilm
- simple ointment
- absorption ointment
- oil in water cream

The amount of salicylic acid reaching the wart varies substantially depending on the formulation used. Brands in the UK include Bazuka (Dendron), Scholl (SSL International), Compound W, Cuplex gel, Duofilm (Stiefel), Occlusal (Alliance), Salatac Gel, Salactol Paint, and Verrugon (Ransom).

== Molecular basis of therapeutic effect ==
- Salicylic acid reaches warts; lactic acid and collodion do not. Therefore, these additional components have only an indirect role in therapy.
- The molecular structure of the skin is altered at the centre of the wart.
- Experiments indicated that salicylic acid bonding within the human papillomavirus-containing verruca tissue is more likely than simple acid dissociation upon dissolution in water within the tissue.

== Complications ==
Some cases of allergic contact dermatitis have been observed when using collodion formulations. This was found to be due to rosin in the collodion.
