= Callus =

Thickened and hardened area of skin

- Other names: Tyloma
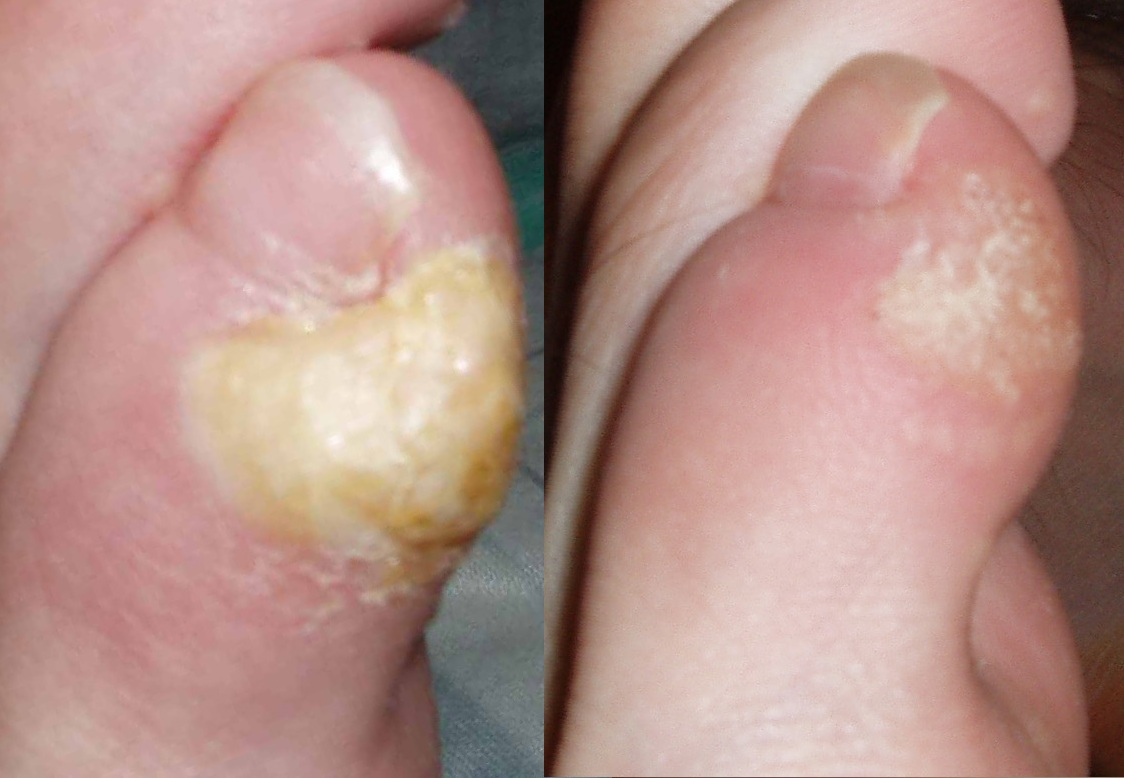
- Examples
- Specialty: Dermatology
- Complications: Skin ulceration, infection

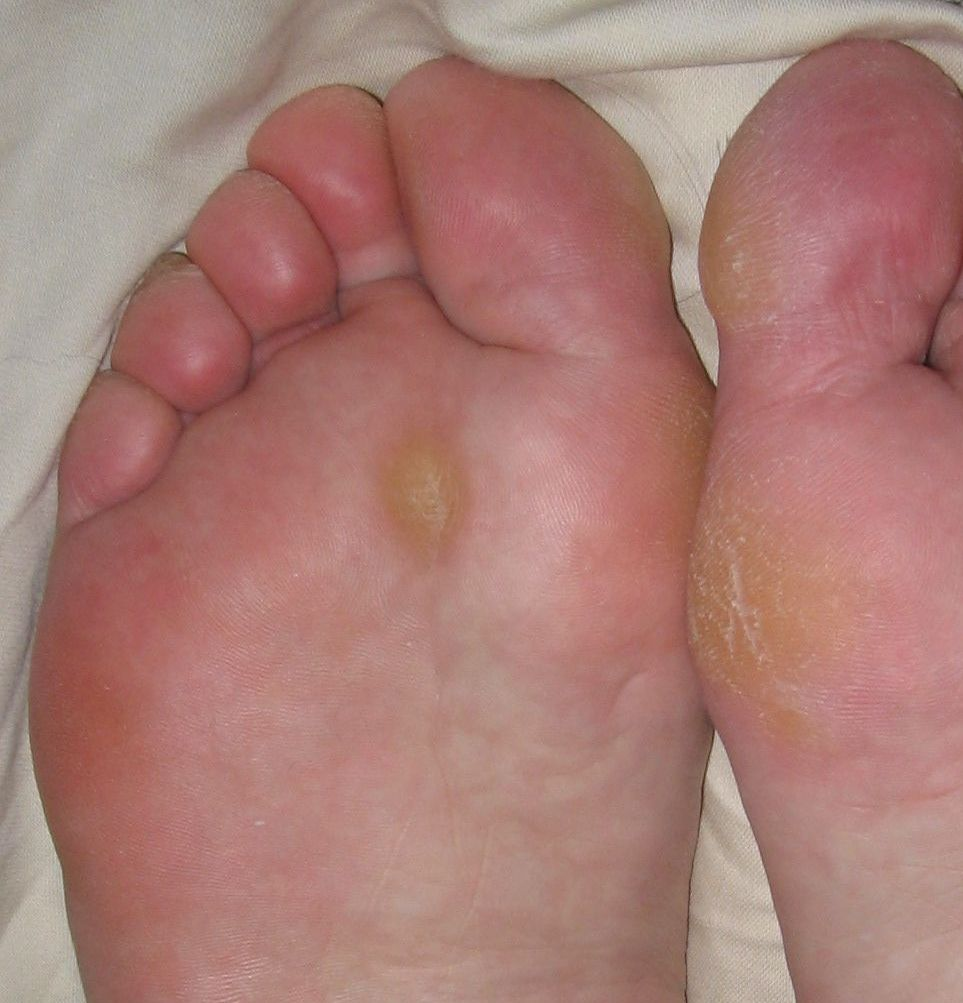
Calluses (plantar in right foot and medial in left foot)

A callus (pl.: calluses; also known as a tyloma) is an area of thickened and sometimes hardened skin that forms as a response to repeated friction, pressure, or other irritation. Since repeated contact is required, calluses are most often found on the feet and hands, but they may occur anywhere on the skin. Some degree of callus, such as on the bottom of the foot, is normal.

Calluses are generally not harmful and help prevent blisters, as well as offering protection. However, excessive formation may sometimes lead to other problems, such as a skin ulceration or infection, or cause the affected person to try to offload the affected painful area, which can place excessive stress on the asymptomatic side.

Rubbing that is too frequent or forceful will cause blisters, as opposed to calluses, to form.

== Cause ==
Normally, a callus will form on any part of the skin exposed to excess friction over a long period of time. Activities that are known for causing calluses include construction work and craftwork, the arts, food preparation, many sports and physical activities, and fashion choices like wearing high heels.

Although calluses can occur anywhere on the body as a reaction to moderate, constant "grinding" pressure, they are most often found on the foot (where the most pressure and friction are applied). On the feet (arguably the source of the most problematic calluses), they typically form on the metatarsal-phalangeal joint area ("balls of the foot"), heels and small toes due to the compression applied by tightly fitting shoes.

Biologically, calluses are formed by the accumulation of terminally differentiated keratinocytes in the outermost layer of skin. Though the cells of calluses are dead, they are quite resistant to mechanical and chemical damage due to extensive networks of cross-linked proteins and hydrophobic keratin intermediate filaments containing many disulfide bonds. It is the natural reaction of the palmar or plantar skin. Too much friction occurring too fast for the skin to develop a protective callus will cause a blister or abrasion instead.

Sometimes a callus occurs where there is no rubbing or pressure. These hyperkeratoses can have a variety of causes. Some toxic materials, such as arsenic, can cause thick palms and soles. Some diseases, such as syphilis, can cause thickening of the palms and soles as well as pinpoint hyperkeratoses. There is a benign condition called keratosis palmaris et plantaris, which produces corns in the creases of the fingers and non-weight bearing spaces of the feet. Some of this may be caused by actinic keratosis, which occurs due to overexposure to sun or with age and hormonal shifts.

=== Corns ===
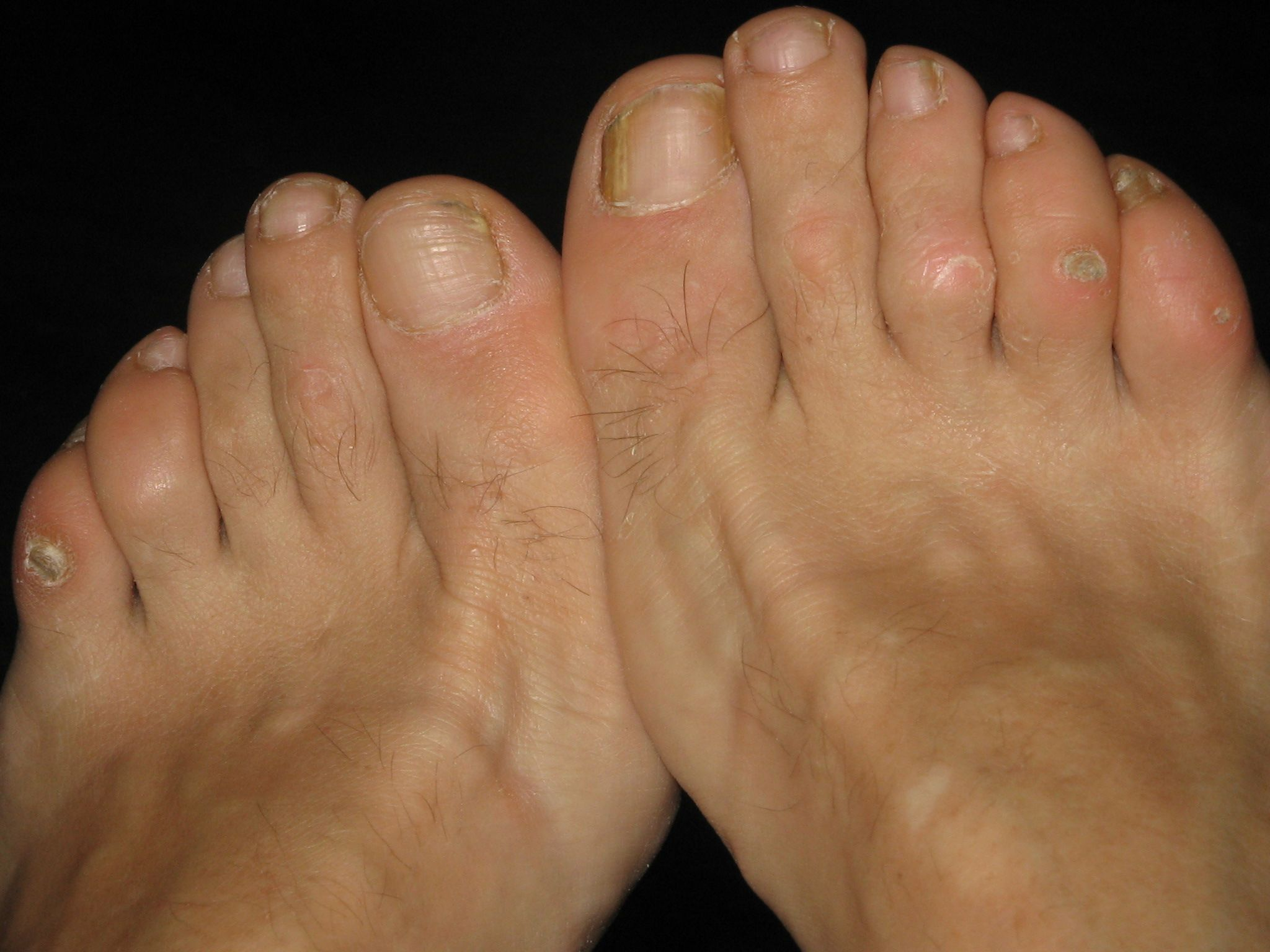
Painful corns

A corn (or clavus, plural clavi) is a cone-shaped callus that penetrates into the dermis, usually on the feet or hands. Corns may form due to chronic pressure or rubbing at a pressure point (the skin over a bone), or due to scar tissue from a healing wound creating pressure in a weight-bearing area such as the sole of the foot. If there is constant stimulation of the tissue producing the corns, even after the corn is surgically removed, the skin may continue to grow as a corn.

The hard part at the center of the corn resembles a funnel with a broad raised top and a pointed bottom. Because of their shape, corns intensify the pressure at the tip and can cause deep tissue damage and ulceration. The scientific name for a corn is heloma (plural helomata). A hard corn is called a heloma durum, while a soft corn is called a heloma molle.

The location of the soft corns tends to differ from that of hard corns. Hard corns occur on dry, flat surfaces of skin. Soft corns (frequently found between adjacent toes) stay moist, keeping the surrounding skin soft. The corn's center is not soft however, but indurated.

The specific diagnostic workup and treatments for corns may differ substantially from other forms of calluses.

== Prevention ==
Corns and calluses are easier to prevent than to treat. When it is undesirable to form a callus, minimizing rubbing and pressure will prevent callus formation. Footwear should be properly fitted, gloves may be worn, and protective pads, rings or skin dressings may be used. People with poor circulation or sensation should check their skin often for signs of rubbing and irritation so they can minimize any damage.

== Treatment ==
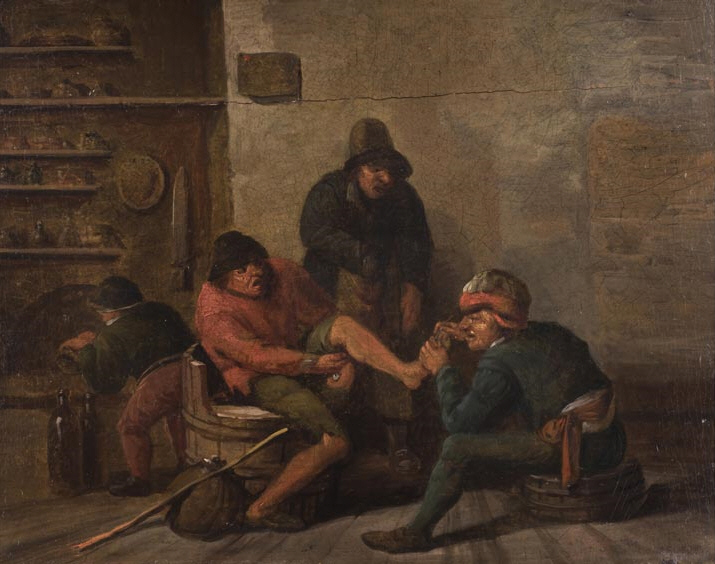
Painting of a person with a callus receiving treatment from a barber surgeon (Attributed to Joos van Craesbeeck, 17th century)

Calluses and corns may heal by themselves eventually, once the irritation is consistently avoided. They may also be dissolved with keratolytic agents containing salicylic acid, sanded down with a pumice stone or silicon carbide sandpaper or filed down with a callus shaver, or pared down by a professional such as a podiatrist.

=== Diabetes ===
People with diabetes face special skin challenges. Because diabetes affects the capillaries, the small blood vessels which feed the skin, thickening of the skin with callus increases the difficulty of supplying nutrients to the skin. Callus formation is seen in high numbers of patients with diabetes, and together with absent foot pulses and formation of hammer toe, this may be an early sign of individuals at an increased risk for foot ulcers.

The stiffness of a callus or corn, coupled with the shear and pressure that caused it, may tear the capillaries or adjoining tissue, causing bleeding within the callus or corn. This can often be result of trying to pick, cut, or shave off the callus by yourself at home. Although the bleeding can be small, sometimes small pools of blood or hematoma are formed. The blood itself is an irritant, a foreign body within the callus that makes the area burn or itch. If the pool of blood is exposed to the outside, infection may follow. Infection may also lead to ulceration. This process can be prevented at several places. Diabetic foot infections are the leading cause of diabetic limb amputation.

== Society and culture ==
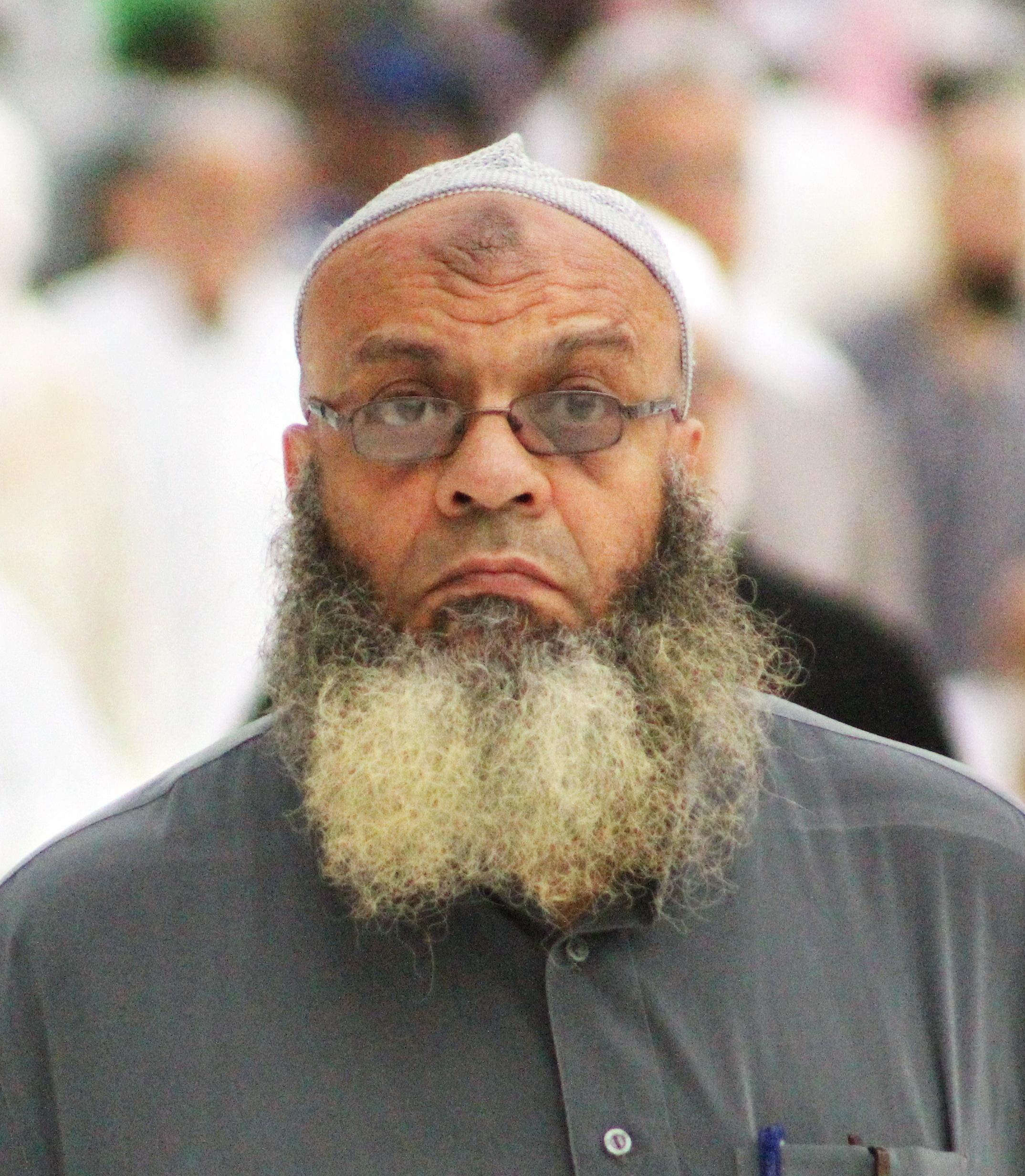
A Muslim man with a prayer bump

Calluses in the hands are frequently associated with manual labor and blue-collar workers. During the Gads Hill Train Robbery in 1874, the James–Younger Gang purportedly refrained from robbing men with calloused hands, assuming them to be working class laborers. A similar notion is also present in Māori culture, where the words raupā and raupo refer to hands left cracked and chapped due to manual work, and are used as similes for someone deemed a hard worker.

Calluses have also been known to develop on the forehead from the frequent prostrations required in Muslim prayer; known as a prayer bump or zebiba, such calluses are considered marks of piety in some Muslim countries, and people have been known to take special steps, such as praying on straw mats, to encourage the callus to develop.

Calluses may also form on the fingertips from the repeated pressure and friction of playing stringed instruments. This formation of calluses allows the player to repeatedly depress the strings without causing pain. Because of this, callus formation is viewed as something of a rite of passage for beginner string players.

Calluses also commonly form on the palms of the hands in certain athletic sports such as weightlifting and gymnastics due to the repeated gripping of bars.

== See also ==
- Callosity
- Hyperkeratosis
