= Keratolytic =

Type of medicine which removes warts

Keratolytic (/ˌkɛrətoʊˈlɪtɪk/) therapy is a type of medical treatment to remove warts, calluses and other lesions in which the epidermis produces excess skin. In this therapy, acidic topical medicines, such as Whitfield's ointment or Jessner's solution, are applied to the lesion in order to thin the skin on and around it. This therapy causes the outer layer of the skin to loosen and shed.

Keratolytics can also be used to soften keratin, a major component of the skin. This serves to improve the skin's moisture binding capacity, which is beneficial in the treatment of dry skin. Such agents (keratolytics) include alkalis (by swelling and hydrolysis of skin), salicylic acid, urea, lactic acid, allantoin, glycolic acid, and trichloroacetic acid.

While cytostatic agents such as zinc pyrithione are first line, keratolytics (salicylic acid and sulfur) can also be used in the treatment of dandruff and seborrheic dermatitis.

Sulfur and salicylic acid can also be used to effectively treat acne and cradle cap in some patients. Resorcinol is another keratolytic that is usually combined with sulfur. Urea acts as a keratolytic due to its hygroscopic property.

== See also ==
- Treatment of warts by keratolysis
- Chemical peel
- Dithranol
- Retinoid
