= Abnormal growths of the nailbed =

- Specialty: Dermatology, oncology

Abnormal growths of the nailbed may often present with paronychia, ingrown nail, onycholysis, nail-plate dystrophy, longitudinal erythronychia, bleeding, and discolorations. There are various different types of growths that may occur in or overlying the nail matrix and in the nailbed. Symptoms can often include pain, itching, and throbbing. Growths are regarded as tumors, then subdivided into benign vs malignant.

== Benign Growths ==
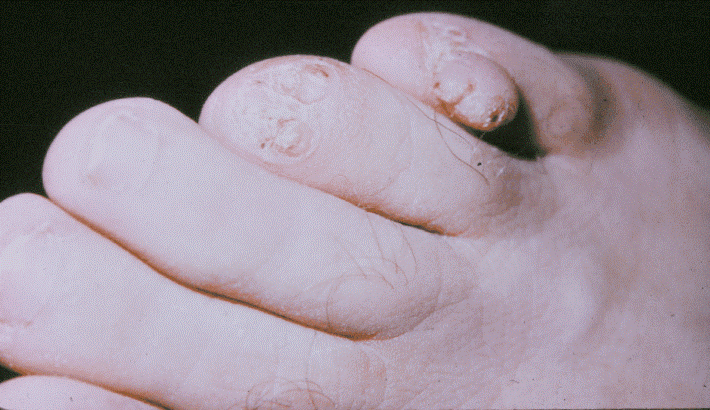
Koenen tumor in patient with tuberous sclerosis complex

Fibroma - Benign tumor of connective tissue that originates commonly from the nail matrix. There are several different types of nail fibromas including: acquired periungual fibrokeratoma, dermatofibroma and periungual fibroma (Koenen Tumor).

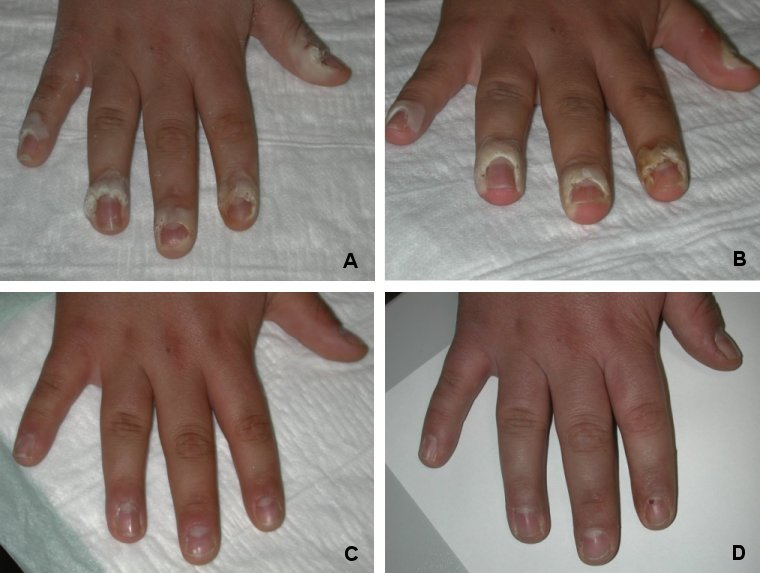
Periungual warts over 18 weeks of treatment

Verruca - Commonly caused by a viral infection, commonly Human papilloma virus (HPV). Depending on the location, growths can cause onycholysis, nail plate dystrophy or ridging. Often resistant to treatment when located underneath the nail.

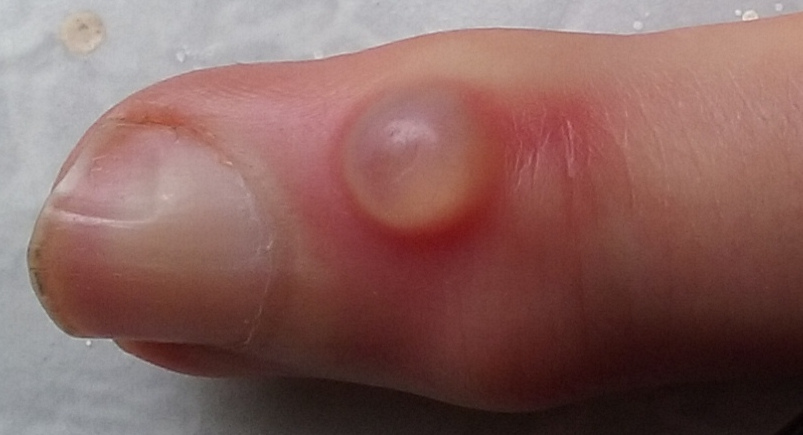
Digital mucous cyst in left index finger with nail depression

Pyogenic Granuloma - Benign growth of blood vessels. Often presents as red to purple.

Myxoid Pseudocyst - Translucent nodule on the digit, located commonly between the distal interphalangeal joint and the nailbed. Often, it appears to leak fluid and may additionally create pressure on the nailbed.

== Malignant Growths ==
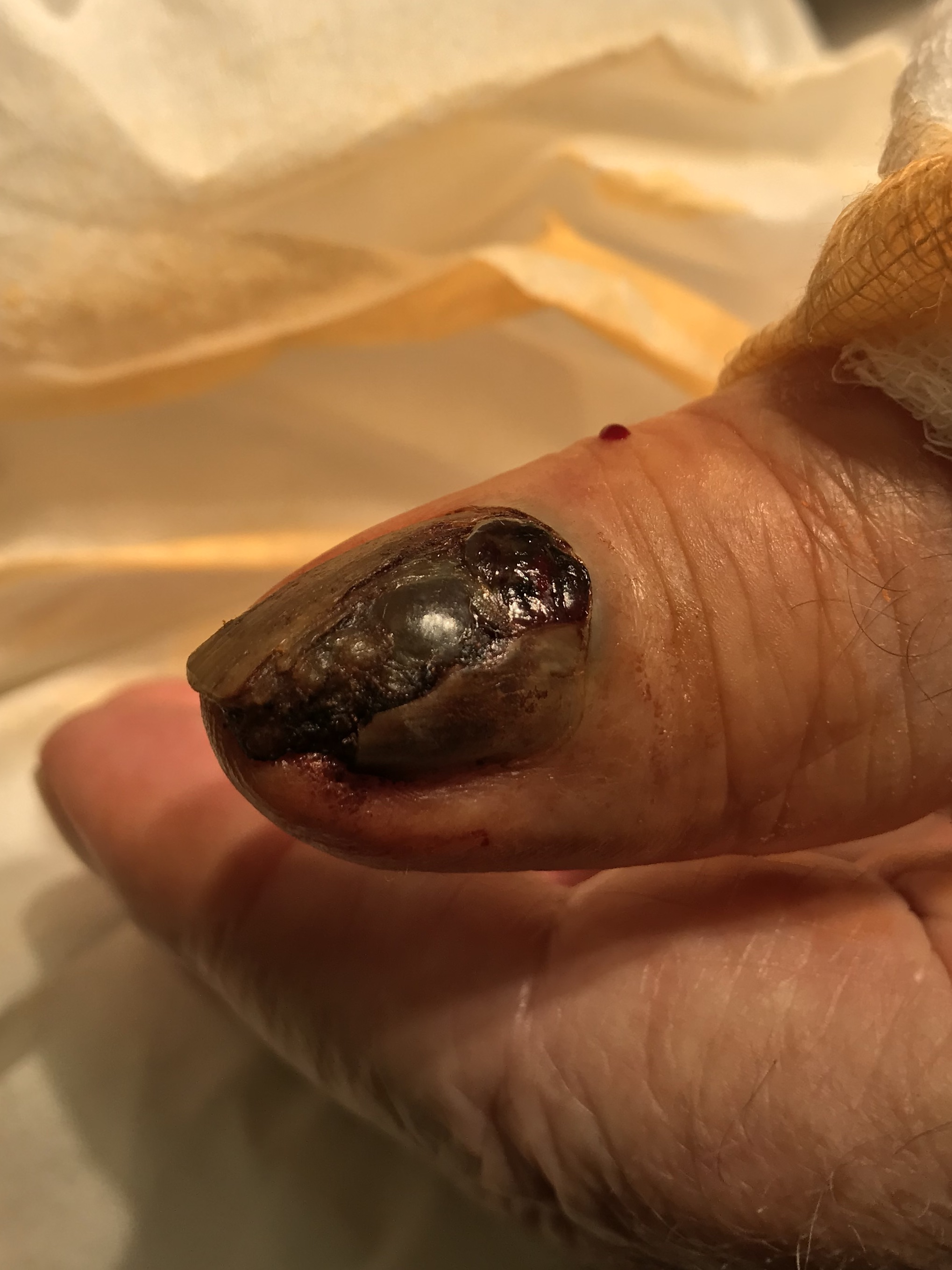
Melanoma of thumb

Squamous Cell Carcinoma - Most common malignant tumor of the nail. It often occurs in the fingernail, within the nailbed, or in the lateral grooves of the nail. SCC often presents with a keratotic lesions that continues to persist even following treatment for common warts. Keratoacanthoma is a rare subtype of SCC that presents as a rapidly growing lesion.

Melanoma - Often diagnosed late in its course, it often appears as a dark stripe within or underneath the nail. The limited data on the subject suggests that digit sparing surgery for subungal melanoma is associated with similar similar but better function.

== Treatment ==
Depending on the type of growth, different treatments can be used. Often cryotherapy, liquid nitrogen spray is used first on lesions. Often, lesions may persist following treatment and require additional follow-up. In rare cases, surgery may be required for definitive treatment.
