= Nail disease =

Nail disease or disorder
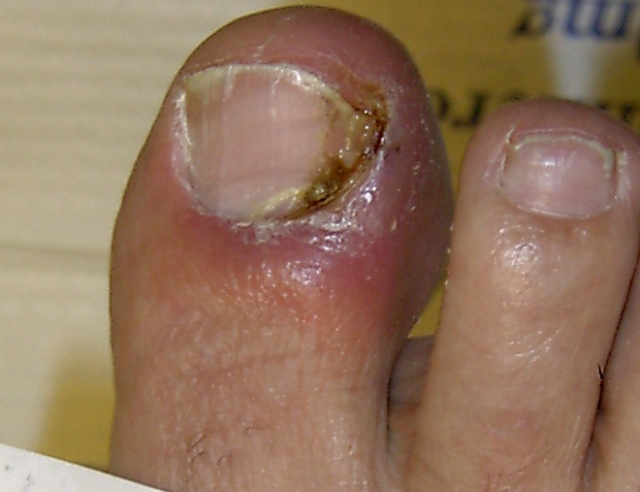
- Onychia without granuloma
- Specialty: Dermatology

A nail disease or onychosis is a disease or deformity of the nail. Although the nail is a structure produced by the skin and is a skin appendage, nail diseases have a distinct classification as they have their own signs and symptoms which may relate to other medical conditions. Some nail conditions that show signs of infection or inflammation may require medical assistance.

== Diseases ==
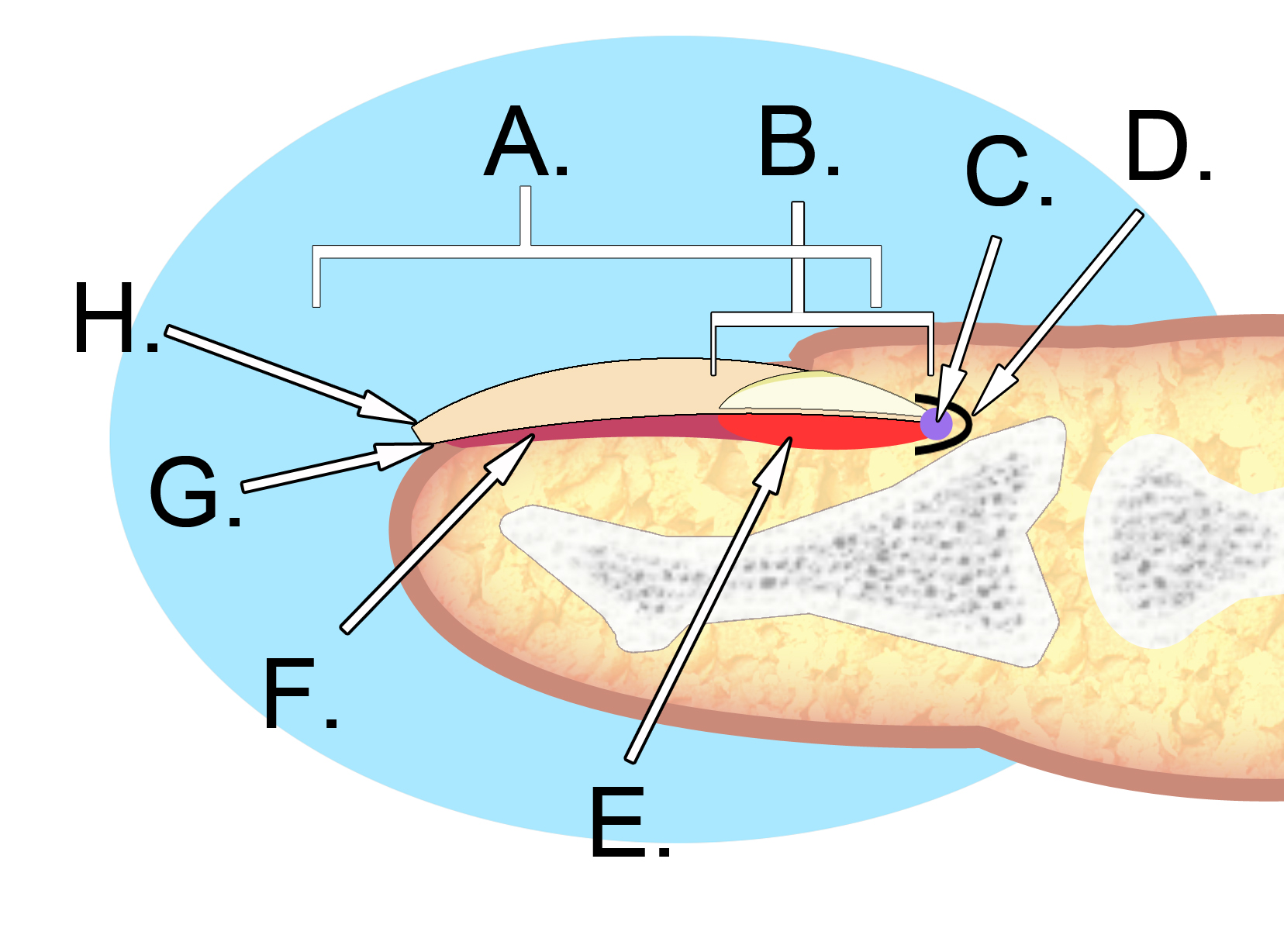
Anatomy of the basic parts of a human nail. A. Nail plate; B. lunula; C. root; D. sinus; E. matrix; F. nail bed; G. eponychium; H. free margin.

- Onychia is an inflammation of the nail folds (surrounding tissue of the nail plate) of the nail with formation of pus and shedding of the nail. Onychia results from the introduction of microscopic pathogens through small wounds.
- Onychocryptosis, commonly known as "ingrown nails" (unguis incarnatus), can affect either the fingers or the toes. In this condition, the nail cuts into one or both sides of the nail bed, resulting in inflammation and possibly infection. The relative rarity of this condition in the fingers suggests that pressure from the ground or shoe against the toe is a prime factor. The movements involved in walking or other physical disturbances can contribute to the problem. Mild onychocryptosis, particularly in the absence of infection, can be treated by trimming and rounding the nail. More advanced cases, which usually include infection, are treated by surgically excising the ingrowing portion of the nail down to its bony origin and thermally or chemically cauterizing the matrix, or 'root', to prevent recurrence. This surgery is called matrixectomy. The best results are achieved by cauterizing the matrix with phenol. The Vandenbos Procedure is a highly effective method that focuses on excision of excessive nail fold tissue without affecting the healthy nail and nail matrix. The Vandenbos Procedure is showing high success rates in eliminating onychocryptosis without altering the normal nail. Another, much less effective, treatment is excision of the matrix, sometimes called a 'cold steel procedure'.

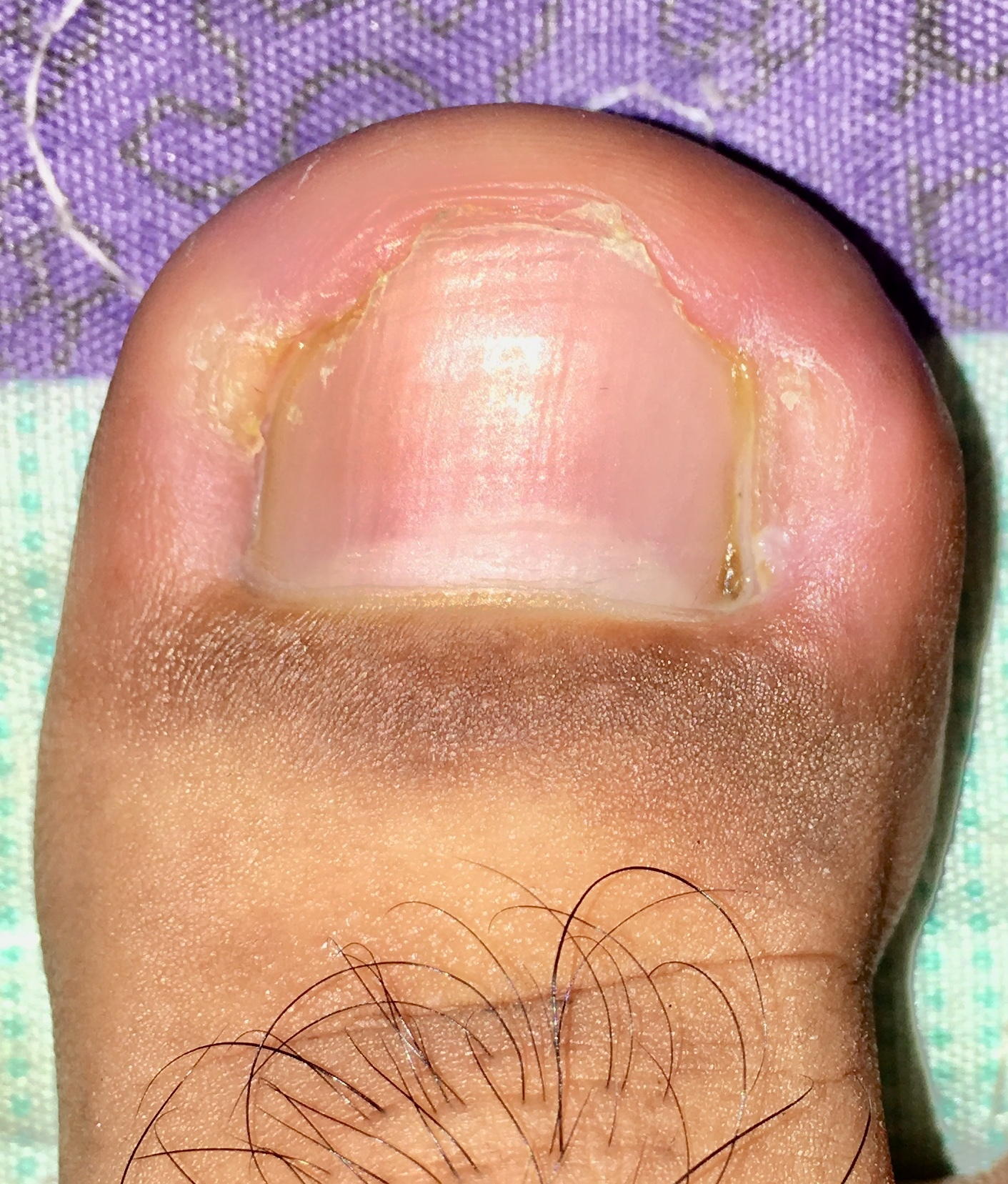
Ingrown nail in hallux toe

- Onychodystrophy is a deformation of the nails that can result from cancer chemotherapy which includes bleomycin, hydroxyurea, or 5-fluorouracil. It can include discoloration of the nail, or dyschromia.
- Onychogryposis, also called "ram's-horn nail", is a thickening and increase in curvature of the nail. It is usually the result of injury to the matrix. It may be partially hereditary and can also occur as a result of long-term neglect. It is most commonly seen in the great toe but may be seen in other toes as well as the fingernails. An affected nail has many grooves and ridges, is brownish in color, and grows more quickly on one side than on the other. The thick curved nail is difficult to cut, and often remains untrimmed, exacerbating the problem.

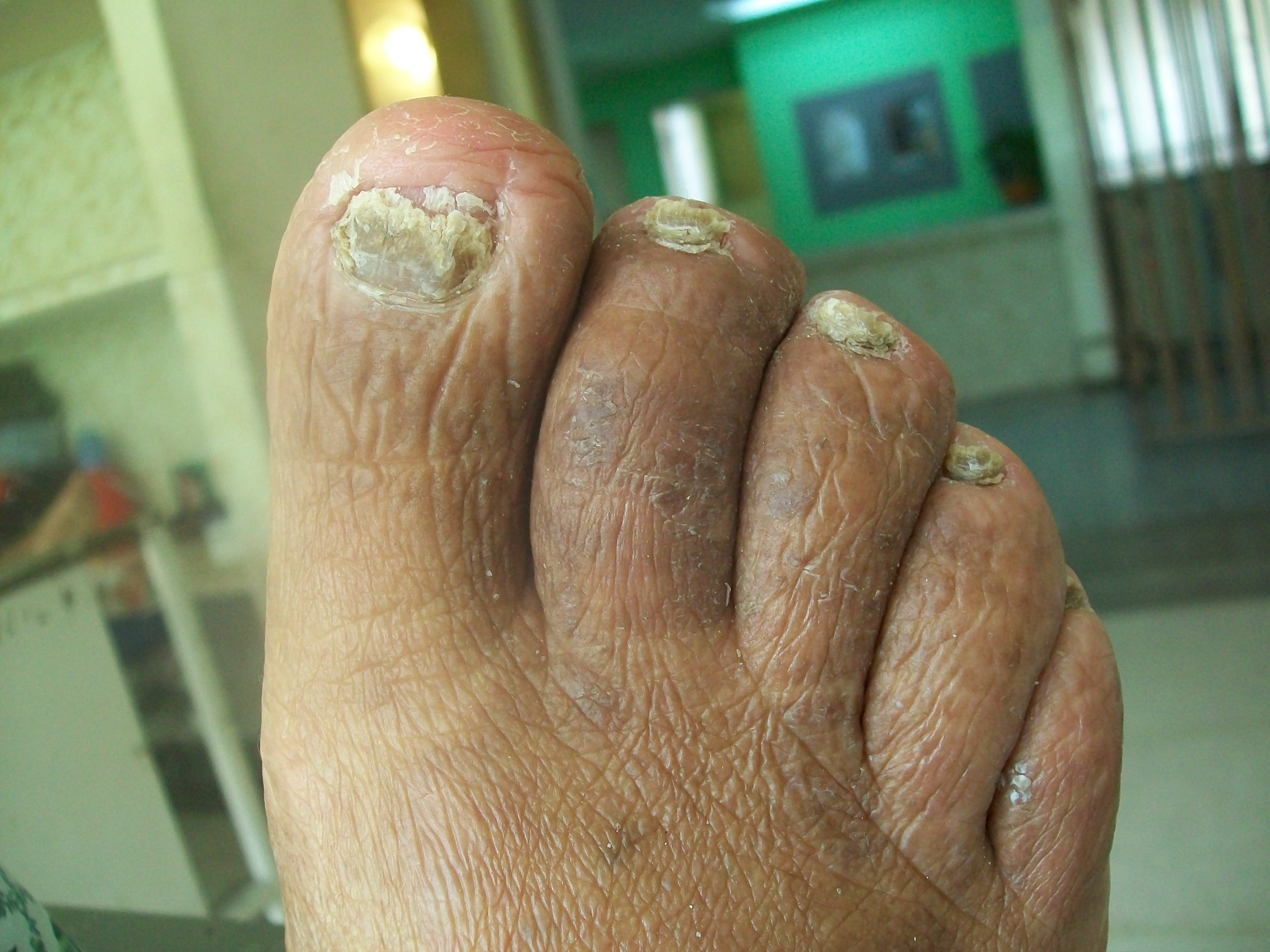
Onychomycosis in every nail of the right foot.

- Onycholysis is a loosening of the exposed portion of the nail from the nail bed, usually beginning at the free edge and continuing to the lunula. It is frequently associated with an internal disorder, trauma, infection, nail fungi, allergy to nail enhancement products, or side effects of drugs.
- Onychomadesis is the separation and falling off of a nail from the nail bed. Common causes include localized infection, minor injury to the matrix bed, or severe systemic illness. It is sometimes a side effect of chemotherapy or x-ray treatments for cancer. A new nail plate will form once the cause of the disease is removed.
- Onychomycosis, also known as tinea unguium, is a contagious infection of the nail caused by the same fungal organisms which cause ringworm of the skin (Trichophyton rubrum or T. mentagrophytes, rarely other trichophyton species or Epidermophyton floccosum). It can result in discoloration, thickening, chalkiness, or crumbling of the nails and is often treated by powerful oral medications which, rarely, can cause severe side effects including liver failure. Mild onychomycosis sometimes responds to a combination of topical antifungal medication, sometimes applied as special medicinal nail lacquer, and periodic filing of the nail surface. For advanced onychomycosis, especially if more than one nail is infected, systemic medication (pills) is preferred. Home remedies are often used, although their effectiveness is disputed.

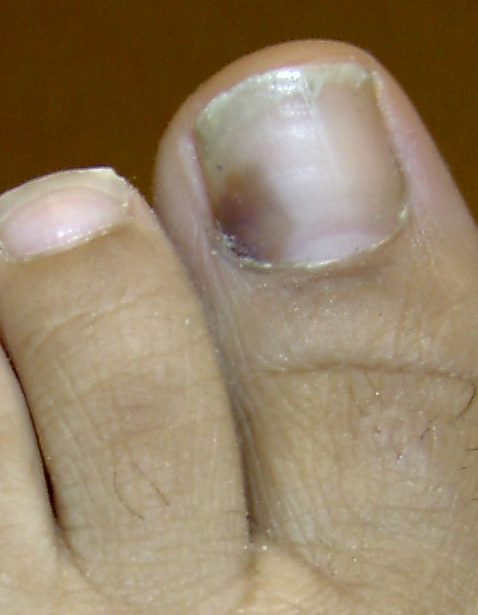
Subungual hematoma (mild)

- Onychophosis is a growth of horny epithelium in the nail.
- Onychoptosis is the periodic shedding of one or more nails, in whole or part. This condition may follow certain diseases such as syphilis, or can result from fever, trauma, systemic upsets or adverse reaction to drugs.
- Onychorrhexis also known as brittle nails, is brittleness with breakage of fingernails or toenails.
- Paronychia is a bacterial or fungal infection where the nail and skin meet.
- Koilonychia is when the nail curves upwards (becomes spoon-shaped) due to an iron deficiency. The normal process of change is: brittle nails, straight nails, spoon-shaped nails.
- Subungual hematoma occurs when trauma to the nail results in a collection of blood, or hematoma, under the nail. It may result from an acute injury or from repeated minor trauma such as running in undersized shoes. Acute subungual hematomas are quite painful, and are usually treated by releasing the blood by creating a small hole in the nail. Drilling and thermal cautery are common methods for creating the hole. Thermal cautery is not used on acrylic nails because they are flammable.
- Onychomatricoma, a tumor of the nail matrix.
- Nail pemphigus, an auto-immune disease.
- Erythronychia, red bands in the nail from some inflammatory conditions.
- Melanonychia, a black, brown or grey discoloration of the nail, with numerous causes.

== Nail changes and conditions associated with them ==
Nail inspection can give hints to the internal condition of the body as well. Nail disease can be very subtle and should be evaluated by a dermatologist with a focus in this particular area of medicine. A nail technician may be the first to note a subtle change in nail health.

=== Pliability ===
- Brittleness is associated with iron deficiency, thyroid problems, and impaired kidney function.
- Splitting and fraying are associated with psoriasis and deficiencies of folic acid, protein, and Vitamin C.
- Unusual thickness is associated with circulation problems.

=== Shape and texture ===
- Nail clubbing - nails that curve down around the fingertips with nailbeds that bulge is associated with oxygen deprivation and lung, heart, or liver disease.
- Koilonychia - spooning, or nails that grow upwards. Associated with iron-deficiency anaemia or vitamin B_{12} deficiency.
- Pitting of the nails is associated with psoriasis.
- Beau's lines are horizontal ridges in the nail.
- Habit-tic deformity is a condition similar to Beau's Lines caused by long-term skin picking.

=== Discoloration of entire nail bed ===
- Yellowing of the nail bed is associated with chronic bronchitis, lymphatic problems, diabetes, and liver disorders.
- Brown or copper nail beds are associated with arsenic or copper poisoning, and local fungal infection.
- Redness is associated with heart conditions.

=== Other color changes and markings ===
- Melanonychia (longitudinal streaking that darkens or does not grow out), especially on the thumb or big toe, may indicate subungual melanoma.
- White lines across the nail (leukonychia striata, or transverse leukonychia) may be Mees' lines or Muehrcke's lines.
- Small white patches are known as leukonychia punctata.
- Dark nails are associated with B_{12} deficiency.
- Stains of the nail plate (not the nail bed) are associated with smoking and henna use.
- Splinter hemorrhages (or haemorrhages) are tiny blood clots that tend to run vertically under the nails.
- Drug-induced nail changes are caused by drug usage which may result in various abnormalities.

== Treatment ==
In approximately half of suspected nail fungus cases there is actually no fungal infection, but only some nail dystrophy. Before beginning oral antifungal therapy, the health care provider should confirm a fungal infection. Administration of treatment to persons without an infection is unnecessary health care and causes needless exposure to side effects.

== See also ==
- Hangnail
- List of cutaneous conditions
- Occupational hazards associated with exposure to human nail dust
- Yellow nail syndrome
