= Red lunulae =

- Specialty: Dermatology

Red lunulae is characterized by a dusky erythema confined to the lunulae, as has been reported in association with alopecia areata. It is most commonly seen on the thumbnail.

== Signs and symptoms ==
Red lunulae describes erythema that either totally or partially takes the place of that structure's typical white tone. It is typically visible on the thumbnail, where the lunula is most noticeable.

== Causes ==
Increased arteriolar blood flow, the vasodilatory capacitance phenomenon, and modifications to the optical characteristics of the nail plate overlaying the blood vessel, which accentuates the normal blood vessels, have all been proposed as possible causes of the red lunula.

Disorders associated with red lunulae include systemic lupus erythematosus, reticulosarcoma, psoriasis, hepatic cirrhosis, lymphogranuloma venereum, rheumatoid arthritis, alopecia areata, cardiac failure, and carbon monoxide poisoning.

== History ==
Terry originally reported red lunulae in patients in 1954.

== See also ==
- Lunula
- Spotted lunulae
