= Onychomatricoma =

- Specialty: Dermatology

Onychomatricoma is a cutaneous condition characterized by a distinctive tumor of the nail matrix.

Symptoms include thickness of the nail plate, transverse or longitudinal overcurvature, xanthonychia, and numerous splinter hemorrhages.

The diagnosis of onychomatricoma is made based on clinical features, dermoscopy, and ultrasonography, and is confirmed by its histological features.

Onychomatricoma is treated by surgical excision.

== Signs and symptoms ==
Thickness of the nail plate, transverse or longitudinal overcurvature, xanthonychia, and numerous splinter hemorrhage are the four main clinical characteristics of onychomatricoma.

== Causes ==
According to recent research, onychomatricoma patients may have genetic changes, such as chromosomal deletion.

== Diagnosis ==
In addition to the traditional tetrad symptoms, other diagnostic techniques such dermoscopy, ultrasonography, and histological findings are also used to make the diagnosis.

Hemorrhagic striae, white longitudinal grooves that match the nail plate channels, and perforations in the distal region of the nail plate are all visible during dermoscopy.

A radiological examination reveals no evidence of onychomatricoma-related underlying bone involvement.

An ultrasonographic examination reveals poor blood flow, a hypoechogenic region corresponding to the fingerlike projections, and a hypoechoic tumoral lesion affecting the nail matrix.

The diagnosis of onychomatricoma is confirmed by its unique histological characteristics. Onychomatricoma is a fibroepithelial tumour that has two different regions. The proximal zone, which is defined by deep epithelial invaginations occupied by overlaying ungual protrusions, is situated beneath the posterior nail fold. The distal zone, corresponding to the lunula, is made up of epithelial digitations that grow from the matrix epithelium and puncture the nail plate.

Among the differential diagnoses are osteochondroma, longitudinal melanonychia, fibrokeratoma, onychomycosis, periungual fibroma, squamous cell carcinoma, Bowen's disease, and subungual verruca vulgaris.

== Treatment ==
Onychomatricoma is treated with surgical excision. To avoid local recurrence, the tumour must be fully removed, including the normal nail matrix close to the lesion.

== Epidemiology ==
As of 2016 less than 80 cases of onychomatricoma have been reported. The majority of cases of onychomatricoma are middle-aged women, with a peak incidence occurring in the fifth decade of life.

== See also ==
- Nail anatomy
- List of cutaneous conditions
- Nail disease
