= Occupational dust exposure =

Occupational hazard in agriculture, construction, forestry, and mining

A video on cleaning dust from workers' clothing

Occupational dust exposure occurs when small particles are generated at the workplace through the disturbance/agitation of rock/mineral, dry grain, timber, fiber, or other material. When these small particles become suspended in the air, they can pose a health risk to those who breathe in the contaminated air.

There are many dust-producing activities across a broad range of industries, including agriculture, construction, forestry, and mining. As such, the nature of occupational dust exposures can vary greatly by chemical composition, size, concentration, and toxicity to humans. Depending on the source, dust composition can include mineral dusts, heavy metals, respiratory sensitizers (chemicals that can cause allergic reactions such as asthma), chemical dusts, molds, spores, and more. Particles generated at workplaces can range in size from microscopic nano-particles (< 0.1 μm) to large, visible dust (50 - 100μm). The concentration of these exposures are affected by their ability to "become airborne depending on their origin, physical characteristics and ambient conditions."

Factors like chemical composition, size, and concentration in the air can have drastic effects on the toxicity of occupational dust exposures. Health effects of exposed workers can range from temporary irritation, to chronic disease, to terminal disease or death. However, these responses can be limited or prevented through proper safety precautions and occupational hygiene. While there is huge variety of dust types and sizes (and their associated diseases), principles of safety and occupational hygiene can be applied to address many

In occupational settings, extremely small dust particles are sometimes referred to as particulates, or particulate matter when referring to certain sizes of particles in the ranges of 10 um, 2.5 um, 0.1 um, etc. Suspended dust in the air can also be referred to as an "aerosol" or "particulate aerosol", though "aerosol" is a broad term that encompasses dust along with other suspended solids/liquids such as fumes or mists.

== Occupations ==
=== Mining ===
During various mining processes in which rock/minerals are broken up and collected for processing, mineral dusts are created and become airborne. Inhalation of these dusts can lead to various respiratory illnesses, depending on the dust type (e.g. coal, silica, etc.), size of the dust particulates, and exposure duration.

=== Forestry ===
During the stages of wood processing, wood dust is generated. 'Wood dust' is "any wood particle arising from the processing or handling of woods." Sawing, routing, sanding, among other activities, form wood dust, which can then become airborne during the process of dust removal from furniture, maintenance, or equipment cleanup.

=== Agriculture ===
Dust generated from milling, handling and storage of grains or fibers can pose a threat to workers' health. During the milling process, solid agricultural grains (corn, barley, wheat, cotton etc.) may undergo crushing, grinding, or granulation. This process generates agricultural dust. Improperly handling grains can also expose workers to grain dusts. Grain storage can also present hazards to workers. Storage structures can create dangerous conditions due to gases emitted from spoiled grains and chemical fumes. "Workers may be exposed to unhealthy levels of airborne contaminants, including molds, chemical fumigants (toxic chemicals), and gases associated with decaying and fermenting silage."

=== Dry Food Manufacturing ===
Working in a dry food manufacturing plant can lead to many adverse health affects. Those who are already predisposed to asthma or other allergic reactions are more at risk for respiratory hazards. There are many adverse effects of inhaling grain dust including the dangerous "grain fever". Symptoms include irritated eyes and nose, wheezing, and chest tightness. A NIOSH sponsored study concluded a 4 mg/m^{3} limit proposed for OSHA, based on an evaluation of 310 grain handlers from Wisconsin and Minnesota. Determined by a physical exam and questionnaire, Rankin et al. found that grain workers are more likely to experience respiratory symptoms than city workers. Having a dust collection system in place can reduce the amount of settled dust on surfaces, reducing the risk of explosions. In addition, a central vacuum system in the facility can make it convenient for operators and production workers to regularly vacuum their surfaces. If exposures are not controlled for, the proper personal protective equipment is needed when working in an environment with airborne dust particles.

=== Construction ===
Crystalline silica (chemically, silicon dioxide) is a very common mineral found in the earth's outside layer. Quartz is the most common type of crystalline silica. Sand, stone, cement, and mortar contain crystalline silica. It is used to make items like glass, stoneware, earthenware, blocks, and manufactured stone. Respirable crystalline silica – microscopic particles of silica can be become airborne and inhaled when cutting, sawing, grinding, or drilling rock or concrete. Silica is used for foundry molds and cores, so exposure can occur when grinding on castings. Fracking uses silica. About 2.3 million individuals in the U.S. are exposed to silica at work.

People who breathe in respirable crystalline silica are at increased risk of developing diseases such as:

- Silicosis, a serious lung ailment that makes breathing difficult;
- Lung cancer;
- Chronic obstructive pulmonary disease (COPD);
- Kidney damage;
- autoimmune disease;
- an increased risk of developing tuberculosis

=== Steel industry ===
According to the Worldsteel Association, the steel industry employs more than 6 million people worldwide. China in 2018, reported being the world's largest producer of steel with 928.3 million tons of steel produced. Steel is a versatile material, the uses range from the automotive industry to the medical industry. Almost every aspect of our lives involves the use of steel in some form. Steel is mostly made of iron, less than 2% of steel is made of carbon and 1% of steel is manganese, there are also small traces of silicon, phosphorus, sulfur, and oxygen found in steel as well.

With more than 6 million people working in the steel industry around the world, these employees have the potential to be exposed to particulate matter from the dust. Since the dust from steel manufacturing of the steel products are done indoors this can lead to the buildup of dust which can be inhaled by employees. An increase of dust levels have had negative health effects on employees as found in their serum protein levels, respiratory, and airway health. Welders, for example, are one of the many steel workers exposed to dust or particles from the steel industry. Since many types of steel contain manganese, steel workers have been found to be exposed to high levels of particles containing manganese. If manganese is found at high levels of exposure, can be neurotoxic to the individual(s). The buildup of these particles can accumulate in the brain and produce symptoms such as tremors, body rigidness, reduces the sense of smell and impairs motor function as well as balance. Alzheimer's disease has also been found as a result of exposure to high levels of manganese. Although, a link to Alzheimer's in welders has been found. It has been found that welders exposed to dust via inhalation have had serum level changes which relate to neurologic disease. An increase in 5 neurology-related proteins were found (GCSF, EFNA4, CTSS, CLM6, VEC2) in welder's blood. Constant changes in neurology-related proteins could result in an increased risk for future disease.

Long term exposure to dust particles containing metallic compounds have been found to impair pulmonary surfactant and lung function which then results in chronic respiratory diseases. There have also been findings of eye irritation from the dust in steel manufacturing. The following preemptive measures can be taken to reduced ones exposure to dust particulates; increasing the ventilation systems inside the industries, wearing personal protective gear such as eyeglasses and masks as well as, washing hands to prevent other dermal or intestinal exposures.

== Health, safety, and epidemiology ==
Exposure to occupational dusts poses many hazards to workers' health and safety. Large, airborne dust particles can obscure vision, limit mobility while on the ground, and interfere with proper machine/equipment functioning. Characteristics of dust particles such as size and chemical qualities can determine the location and effects of the dust particles on the respiratory system.

=== Lung diseases ===
Lung disease is one of the premiere issues with occupational dust exposure. Common illnesses/diseases that can develop due to exposure to workplace dust include:

- Hypersensitivity Pneumonitis
- Occupational Asthma
- COPD (Bronchitis, Emphysema)
- Pneumoconiosis (Coal Workers' Pneumoconiosis, Asbestosis, Silicosis)
- Mycobacterial Infections

=== Safety ===
Workplace facilities have in place safety protocol and regulations to ensure that exposure to dust/particulate matter is minimal to non-existent. To control an airborne dust, the workplace must first monitor the air for exposures. Typically, concentration of air contaminants is measured and compared to set exposure limits. In the United States, these often follow personal exposure limits (PEL) set by OSHA, or threshold limit values (TLV) set by ACGIH. The two most common ways of measuring airborne contaminants are through personal sampling or area sampling. Personal sampling involves using a device to measure the air near a person's breathing zone, usually done through air pumps that are placed directly on a worker and gather sample air near the worker's face. These are preferable to area samples, which only measure the air in a fixed location, since personal samples better approximate the actual concentration inhaled by a worker.

Once the airborne contaminants have been identified and measured, workplaces often implement controls based on the hierarchy of controls. This may include eliminating a dust generating agent, or simply replacing a highly toxic agent with a safer one. Engineering controls such as wet methods, dust collectors, and improved HVAC systems can also be highly protective. Administrative measures such as shift rotations can also help reduce personal exposures to acceptable levels. Lastly, PPE can be an effective method of helping individual workers avoid inhaling harmful aerosols. Due to the varied nature of many workplace dust exposures, there is no single best way to measure and control for aerosols; often, it is required that professional judgement be employed to properly address occupational dust exposures.

== See also ==
- Pneumoconiosis
- Organic dust toxic syndrome
- Occupational hazards associated with exposure to human nail dust
- Occupational safety and health
- Agricultural safety and health
- Mine safety
- Hierarchy of hazard controls
- Dust collection system
- Renovation
- Power tool
- Lead paint
- Welding
- Particulates
