= Pincer =

Pincer may refer to:

- Pincers (tool)
- Pincer (biology), part of an animal
- Pincer ligand, a terdentate, often planar molecule that tightly binds a variety of metal ions
- Pincer (Go), a move in the game of Go
- "Pincers!", an episode of the TV series Pocoyo

== See also ==
- Pincer movement, military manoeuvre
- Pincer nail (medicine)
