= Spiculectomy =

Surgical procedure on the foot

Spiculectomy is a minor soft-tissue surgical procedure to remove a spicule or splinter, often a fragment of toenail, penetrating the nail bed. This condition is often associated with ingrown nails. Spiculectomies may be performed by a podiatrist or podiatric surgeon, and the procedure usually has good outcomes even in high-risk patients.
