= Nail–patella syndrome =

- Other names: NPS
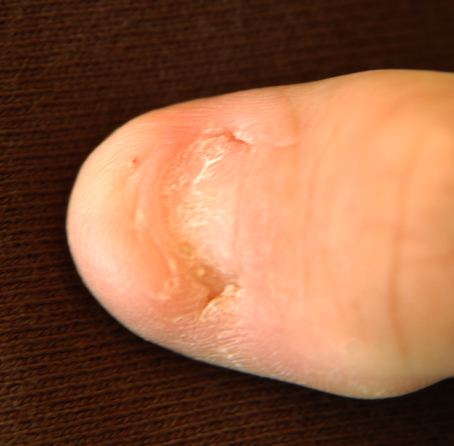
- Nail of a patient with nail–patella syndrome
- Specialty: Medical genetics
- Causes: mutations in the LMX1B gene.

Nail–patella syndrome is a rare genetic disorder that results in small, poorly developed or deformed nails (especially of thumbs) and — next in order/frequency — hypoplastic kneecaps. A unique feature of this syndrome is the usually triangular — rather than semicircular, as in healthy individuals — lunulae at the base of the fingernails. But nail-patella syndrome can also affect many other areas of the body, such as the elbows, chest, hips and others. The name "nail–patella" can be very misleading, because the syndrome usually is associated simultaneously with many various areas of the body, including even the production of certain proteins. The severity of these effects varies depending on the individual. It is also referred to as iliac horn syndrome, hereditary onychoosteodysplasia (HOOD syndrome), Fong disease or Turner–Kieser syndrome. This syndrome is caused by mutations in the LMX1B gene (see below).

Diagnosis of NPS can be made at birth but is common for it to remain undiagnosed for several generations. While there is no cure available for NPS, treatment is available and recommended.

In the international medical classification (ICD), the syndrome is included in the category Q87.2 — Congenital malformation syndromes predominantly involving limbs.

== Signs and symptoms ==
Characteristic nails, especially of thumbs — as in the description above (the most common and recognizable feature of NPS, in about 95% patients).

The skeletal structures of individuals who have this disorder may have pronounced deformities. As reported by several medical doctors, the following features are commonly found in people who with nail–patella syndrome:

Bones and joints

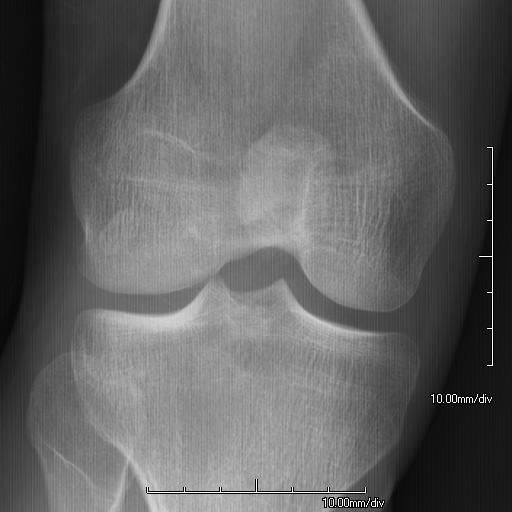
AP radiograph showing a hypoplastic patella in NPS

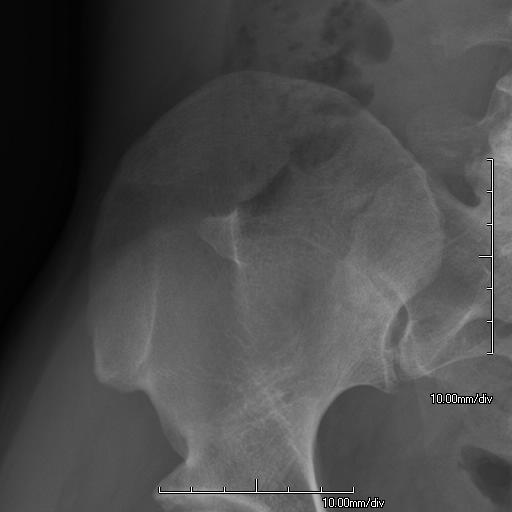
AP radiograph of the right iliac crest showing a bony exostosis or posterior iliac horn, which is pathognomonic of NPS

- Patellar involvement is present in approximately 75% of patients; however, patellar aplasia occurs in only 20%.
- In instances in which the patellae are smaller or luxated, the knees may be unstable.
- The knee joint may appear square.
- Frequent flat feet and/or other foot deformities.
- The elbows may have limited motion (e.g., limited pronation, supination, extension).
- Subluxation of the radial head may occur.
- Arthrodysplasia of the elbows is reported in approximately 75% of patients.
- Exostoses arising from the posterior aspect of the iliac bones ("iliac horns") are present in as many as 70–75% of patients; this finding is considered pathognomonic for the syndrome.
- Other reported bone changes include scoliosis, scapular hypoplasia, and the presence of cervical ribs.
- A reduction in bone density, on average by about 8–20 %, which may lead to osteoporosis.
- Contractures of the joints can be present. On the other hand — a possible joints sublocations and hypermobility/laxity has also been described (regarding the impact of the *LMX1B* gene mutation on the activity of other various genes and on connective tissue).
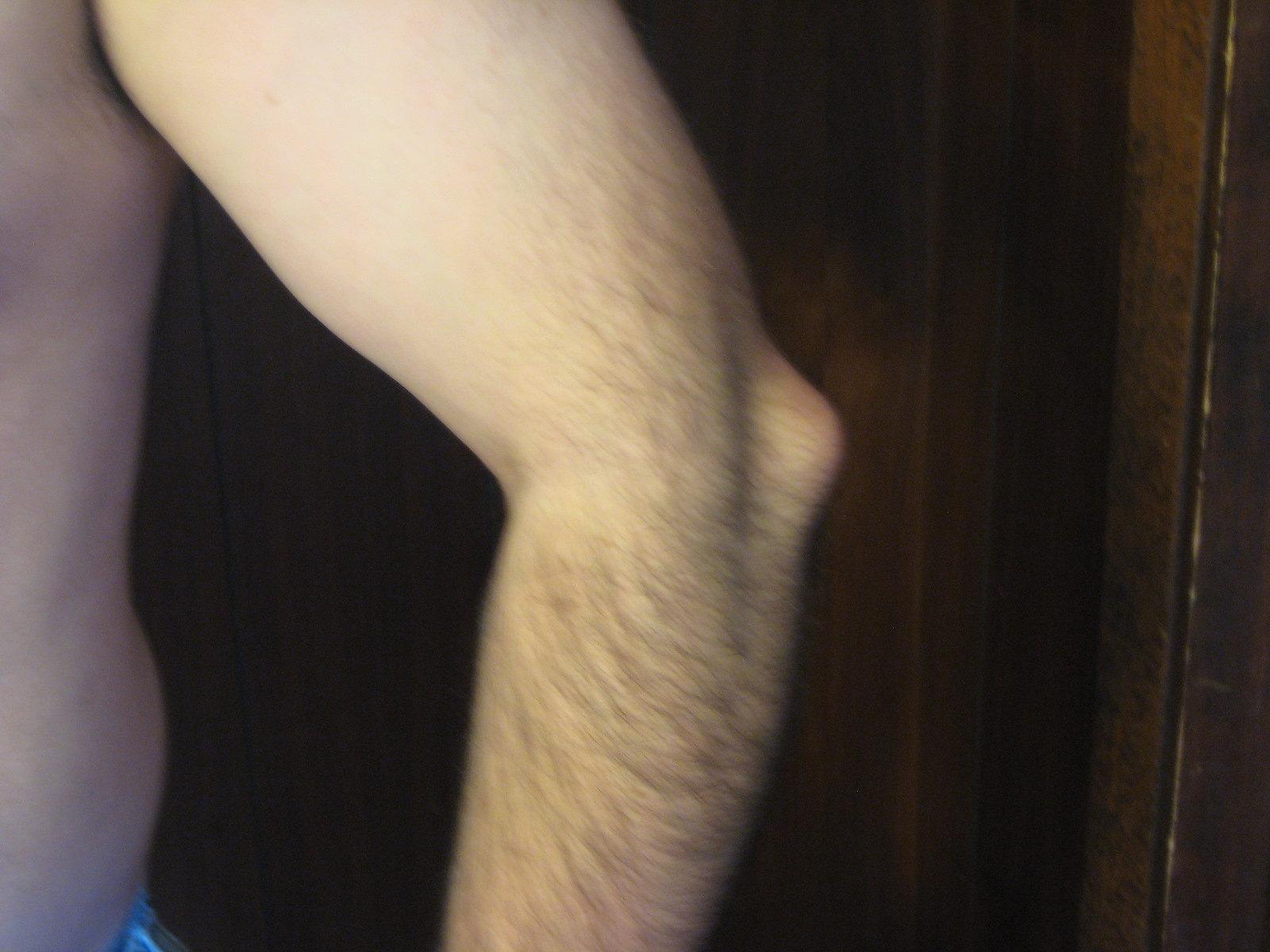
An elbow of a man with nail–patella syndrome (NPS)

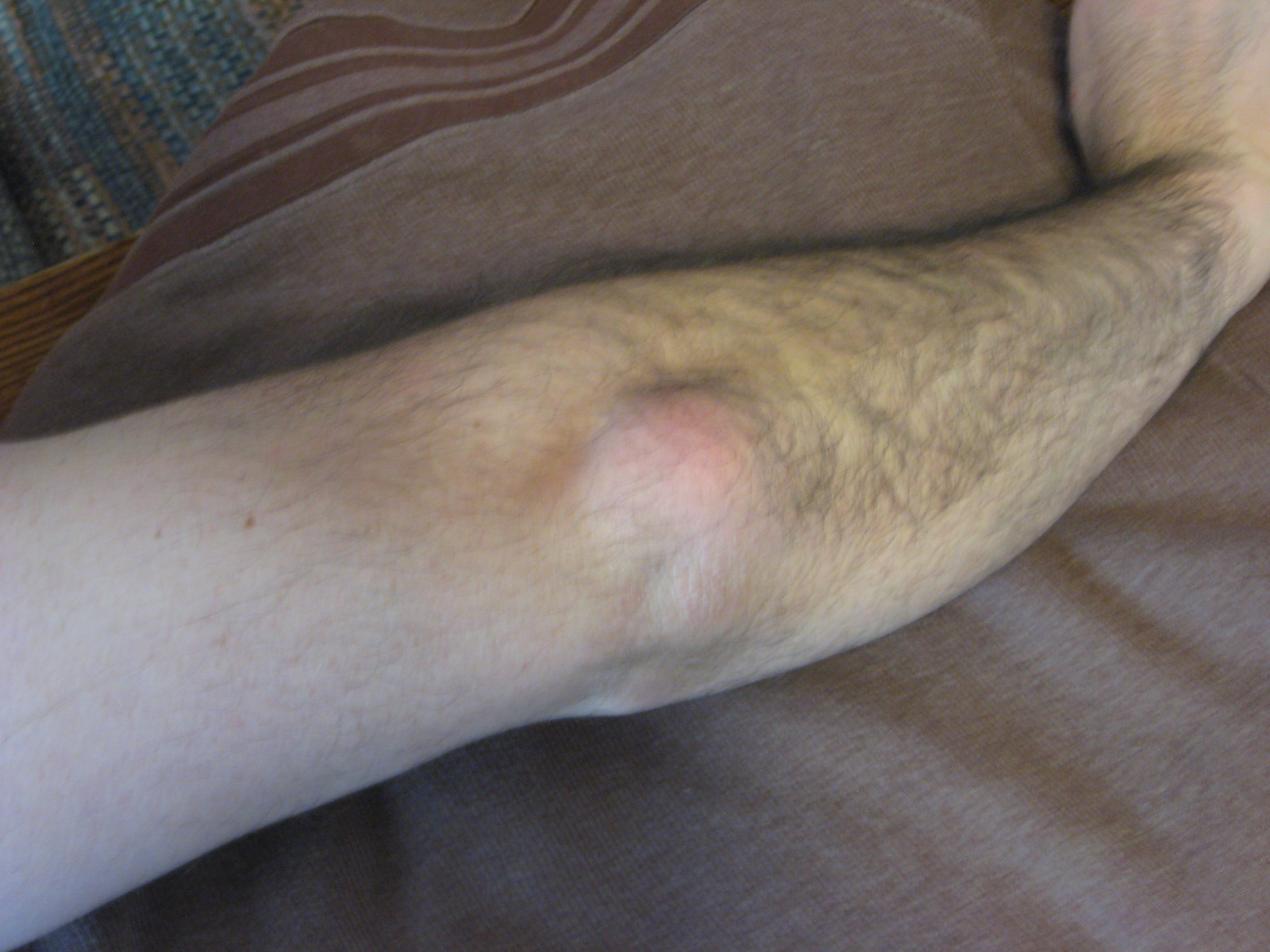
This is a view from a different angle of the same man's other elbow

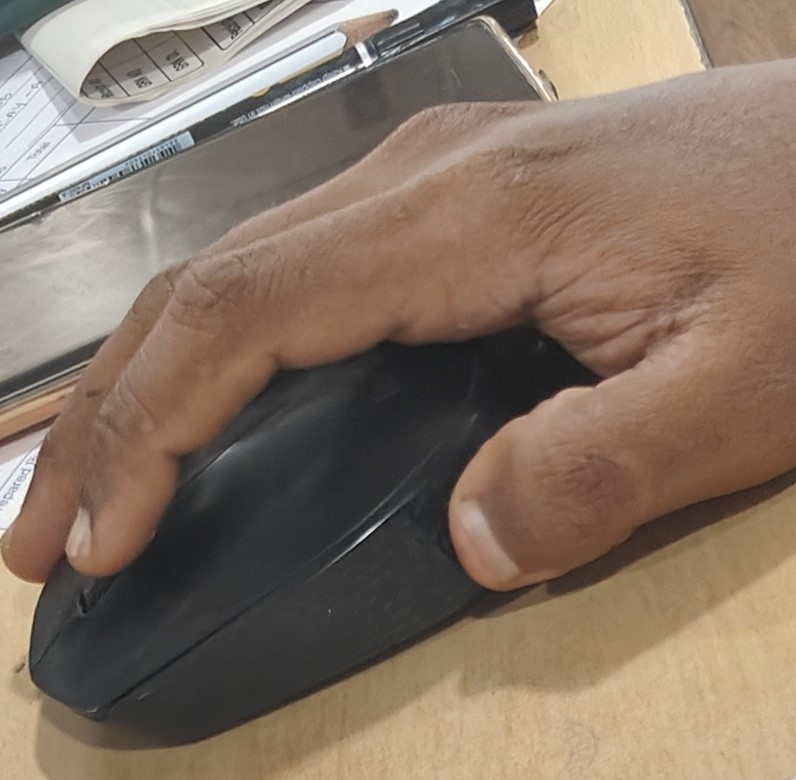

Glaucoma is also closely associated with nail-patella, specifically open-angled glaucoma (OAG). Side effects may include frequent headaches, blurred vision, or total vision loss. This occurs gradually over time and symptoms may not be evident in children.

Kidney issues may arise such as deposition of protein in the urine and nephritis. Proteinuria is usually the first sign of kidney involvement. It can reveal itself either rapidly or years after having asymptomatic deposition of protein in the urine, kidney failure occurs in around 15% of NPS patients (in form of end-stage failure). Irritable bowel syndrome and other gastrointestinal involvement, decreased sensation of pain and temperature in the hands and feet, e.g. Raynaud syndrome and other vascular disorders, attention deficit hyperactivity disorder (ADHD), depression and thin tooth enamel are associated with NPS, but the exact nature of these relationships remains not fully explained.

General appearance (general phenotype) — it is possible and frequent to have lean body type (difficulty gaining weight even with a healthy and nutritious diet) and underdeveloped muscle mass, particularly in the limbs. It is most noticeable in young people with nail-patella syndrome, but not exclusively. Absence or underdevelopment of various muscles (e.g. triceps, leading to thin structure of arms) and a high forehead — also may be present. However, low body weight sometimes can change (grow) with age, for example in women going through menopause, under the influence of other changes in metabolism, various medications and other factors. Eventual possible weight gain — later in life — does not necessarily have to be associated with an increase in muscle mass.

Nail–patella syndrome may cause diverse and not always uniform symptoms in individual patients — it is associated with high phenotypic variability, even in the same family. In milder cases, some patients may only experience part of symptoms of this syndrome. Some potential symptoms (such as e.g. possible kidney damage or mentioned glaucoma) may appear and become more apparent with age and/or under the influence of additional aggravating factors. Other, than mentioned above, possible symptoms of NPS are also described in specialized sources, because the mutated gene can affect the entire body.

== Genetics ==
Nail–patella syndrome is inherited in an autosomal dominant pattern.

Nail–patella syndrome is inherited via autosomal dominancy linked to aberrancy on human chromosome 9's q arm (the longer arm), 9q34. This autosomal dominancy means that only a single copy, instead of both, is sufficient for the disorder to be expressed in the offspring, meaning the chance of getting the disorder from an affected heterozygous parent is 50%. The frequency of the occurrence is 1/50,000. The disorder is linked to the ABO blood group locus.

It is associated with random mutations in the LMX1B gene. Studies have been conducted and 83 mutations of this gene have been identified.

== Diagnosis ==
The hallmark features of this syndrome are poorly developed fingernails (especially of thumbs) — in approximately 95 percent of patients, rarely — toenails (especially the smallest nail of feet), and hypoplastic or aplastic patellae (kneecaps) — in approximately 75 percent of patients. Sometimes, this disease causes the affected person to have either no thumbnails or a small piece of a thumbnail on the edge of the thumb. The lack of development or complete absence of fingernails results from the loss of function mutations in the LMX1B gene. A unique feature of this syndrome is also the triangular lunulae at the base of the fingernails — especially in NPS patients who have nails present (in healthy individuals, without NPS, lunulae are semicircular). This mutation may cause a reduction in dorsalising signals, which then results in the failure to normally develop dorsal specific structures such as nails and patellae. Other common abnormalities include elbow deformities, kidney disease, and abnormally shaped pelvic (hip) bones. Individual cases of this syndrome may be diverse and not fully symptomatic, as is the case with any genetic syndrome, they may also affect fitness and functioning of the body to varying degrees — from severe to mild cases (different mutations — pathogenic variants regarding other fragments/exons of the same gene and varying degrees of impact on the phenotype and areas of the body, even in the case of the same mutation in relatives in the same family).

== Treatment ==
Treatment for NPS varies depending on the symptoms observed.

- Perform screening for kidney disease and glaucoma, surgery, intensive physiotherapy, or genetic counseling.
- ACE inhibitors are taken to treat proteinuria and hypertension in NPS patients.
- Dialysis and kidney transplant.
- Physical therapy, bracing and analgesics for joint pain.

== See also ==
- List of cutaneous conditions
- List of radiographic findings associated with cutaneous conditions
