= Platonychia =

- Specialty: Dermatology

Platonychia is characterized by an abnormally flat and broad nail, and may be seen as part of an autosomal-dominant condition in which multiple nail abnormalities are present in many members of a large family. Seen in iron deficiency condition.

== See also ==
- Koilonychia
- Nail anatomy
