= Median nail dystrophy =

- Other names: Dystrophia unguis mediana canaliformis, median canaliform dystrophy of Heller, and solenonychia.
- Specialty: Dermatology

Median nail dystrophy, also known as dystrophia unguis mediana canaliformis, median canaliform dystrophy of Heller, and solenonychia consists of longitudinal splitting or canal formation in the midline of the nail, a split which often resembles a fir tree, occurring at the cuticle and proceeding outward as the nail grows.

Thumbs, which are the most commonly involved, usually show an enlarged lunula resulting probably from repeated pressure applied on the base of the nail.

== Signs and symptoms ==
Median nail dystrophy presents as splitting that resembles an upside-down fir tree or Christmas tree because to tiny fissures or cracks that break toward the nail edge or extend laterally from the center canal. Usually symmetrical, the ailment primarily affects the thumbs, though it can also affect other fingers or toes. There may be lunula enlargement, redness, and thickening of the proximal nail fold.

== Causes ==
Although it is an acquired illness, there have been reports of familial clustering of instances. The illness most likely stems from a transient flaw in the matrix that prevents nails from growing. One component that has been identified as causal is trauma.

== Diagnosis ==
Clinical findings are frequently the only basis for diagnosis. Parakeratosis, or the buildup of melanin inside and between the keratinocytes in the nail bed, is typically seen in histopathology.

== Treatment ==
For median nail dystrophy, treatment is frequently not required. Normalcy usually returns to affected nails on its own, either when medication is stopped or after a traumatic event. Triamcinolone acetonide injected directly into the proximal nail fold or topical ointments have been effectively used in the treatment of median nail dystrophy, though this is not usually advised.

== See also ==
- Nail (anatomy)
- Habit-tic deformity
