= Spotted lunulae =

- Specialty: Dermatology

Spotted lunulae is a distinctive change that occurs with alopecia areata.

Spotted lunulae appears as tiny, round, crimson patches that are not eliminated by vitropressure. Its boundaries are evenly spaced and clearly defined across the lunula.

Spotted lunulae is a symptom of nail matrix inflammation linked to several illnesses, such as nail psoriasis and alopecia areata.

== Signs and symptoms ==
Spotted lunulae appears as tiny, round, reddish patches that are resistant to vitropressure. Its boundaries are evenly spaced out over the lunula and clearly defined.

== Causes ==
Spotted lunulae is an indication of inflammation in the nail matrix linked to several illnesses, including as alopecia areata and nail psoriasis.

== Treatment ==
Treatment of spotted lunulae depends on the underlying disorder.

== Epidemiology ==
In one study spotted lunulae was reported to affect 6 out of 126 pediatric patients with alopecia areata. In another study the prevalence of spotted lunulae was 13%.

== History ==
Spotted lunulae was first reported by Shelley in 1980.

== See also ==
- Lunulae
