= Chromonychia =

Abnormal nail discoloration

Chromonychia is an abnormality in color of the substance or surface of the nail plate or subungual tissues.

Chromonychia can be induced by antineoplastic drugs with few distinct forms, the most frequently seen is melanonychia. Although a few cytostatics may cause these changes, the drugs most commonly involved are adriamycin, cyclophosphamide and vincristine, or in polychemotherapy

Also chromonychia is associated with AIDS. A significant association (p<0.05) was found between chromonychia and CD4 counts of below 200 per cubic millimeter.
