= Hangnail =

Torn piece of skin next to a fingernail or toenail

- Other names: Agnail, Stepmother's blessing
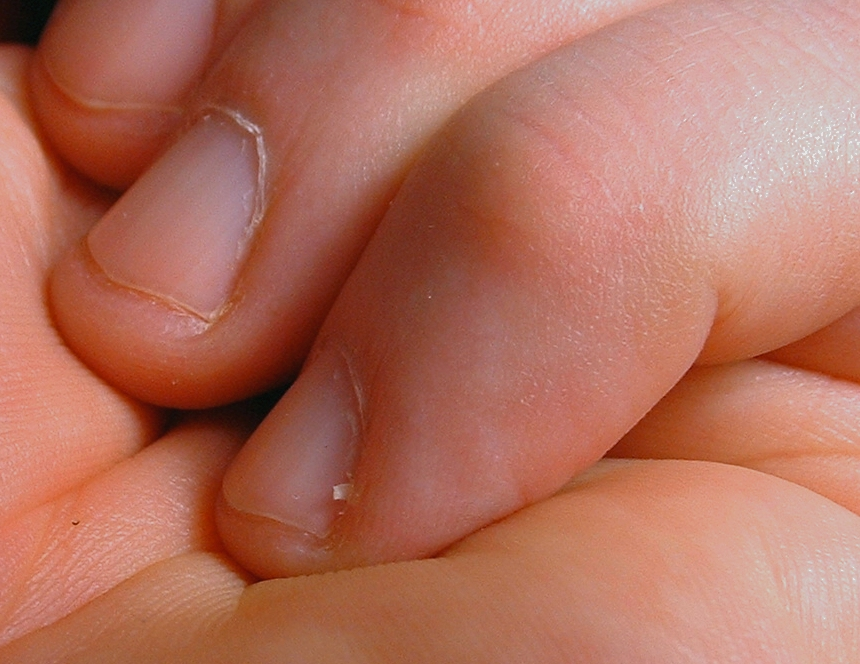
- The bottom finger has a hangnail.
- Specialty: Dermatology

A hangnail is a small piece of skin or nail next to a fingernail or toenail. Hangnails are typically caused by having dry skin, trauma to the fingers, or ingrown nails.

Hangnails can become infected and cause paronychia, a type of skin infection that causes inflammation around the nails. Hangnails may also cause pain if pulled as they may remain attached to living skin.

Daily use of hand lotion (or hand cream) or cuticle oil may help prevent the formation of hangnails.

For home treatment, the American Academy of Dermatology recommends clipping the loose piece of skin with a clean nail clipper or nail scissors, and applying over-the-counter antibiotic ointment if the area appears inflamed. Persistent hangnails should be evaluated by a physician.
