= Laugier–Hunziker syndrome =

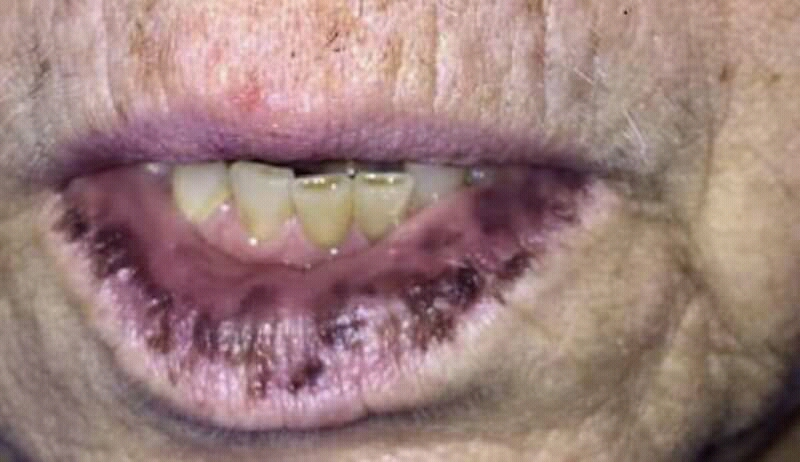
- Specialty: Dermatology

Laugier–Hunziker syndrome (/ˈloʊʒieɪ ˈhʊntsɪkər/) is a cutaneous condition characterized by hyperpigmentation of the oral mucosa, longitudinal melanonychia, and genital melanosis.

The hyperpigmentation presented in Laugier-Hunziker syndrome is benign and should be differentiated from Peutz-Jeghers syndrome.

== See also ==
- Peutz–Jeghers syndrome
- List of cutaneous conditions
