= LMX1B =

Protein-coding gene in the species Homo sapiens

Identifiers
- Aliases: LMX1B, LMX1.2, NPS1, LIM homeobox transcription factor 1 beta, FSGS10
- External IDs: OMIM: 602575; MGI: 1100513; GeneCards: LMX1B

Gene location (Human)
Chr.	Chromosome 9 (human)
Band	9q33.3	Start	126,613,928 bp
Band	9q33.3	End	126,701,032 bp

Gene location (Mouse)
Chr.	Chromosome 2 (mouse)
Band	2 B|2 22.48 cM	Start	33,450,977 bp
Band	2 B|2 22.48 cM	End	33,530,620 bp
RNA expression pattern
Bgee	Human / Mouse (ortholog); Top expressed in: sural nerve; testicle; gonad; skin of leg; right auricle of heart; human kidney; skin of abdomen; apex of heart; olfactory zone of nasal mucosa; substantia nigra / Top expressed in: lumbar subsegment of spinal cord; hand; central gray substance of midbrain; lacrimal gland; genital tubercle; foot; digit; renal corpuscle; finger; surface ectoderm; More reference expression data
BioGPS	n/a
Gene ontology
Molecular function	DNA-binding transcription factor activity; DNA binding; sequence-specific DNA binding; RNA polymerase II transcription regulatory region sequence-specific DNA binding; protein binding; metal ion binding; RNA polymerase II general transcription initiation factor activity; DNA-binding transcription factor activity, RNA polymerase II-specific
Cellular component	nucleus
Biological process	multicellular organism development; dopaminergic neuron differentiation; in utero embryonic development; regulation of transcription, DNA-templated; dorsal/ventral pattern formation; transcription, DNA-templated; neuron differentiation; positive regulation of transcription by RNA polymerase II
Sources:Amigo / QuickGO
Orthologs
Databases	NCBI: entry; OMA: entry
Species	Human	Mouse
Entrez	4010	16917
Ensembl	ENSG00000136944	ENSMUSG00000038765
UniProt	O60663	O88609
RefSeq (mRNA)	NM_002316; NM_001174146; NM_001174147	NM_010725
RefSeq (protein)	NP_001167617; NP_001167618; NP_002307	NP_034855
Location (UCSC)	Chr 9: 126.61 – 126.7 Mb	Chr 2: 33.45 – 33.53 Mb
PubMed search
- Wikidata
View/Edit Human	View/Edit Mouse

LIM homeobox transcription factor 1-beta, also known as LMX1B, is a protein which in humans is encoded by the LMX1B gene.

== Function ==
LMX1B is a LIM homeobox transcription factor which plays a central role in dorso-ventral patterning of the vertebrate limb.

== Clinical significance ==
Loss-of-function mutations in the LMX1B gene are associated with Nail-patella syndrome.
