= Melanonychia =

Black or brown pigmentation of nails

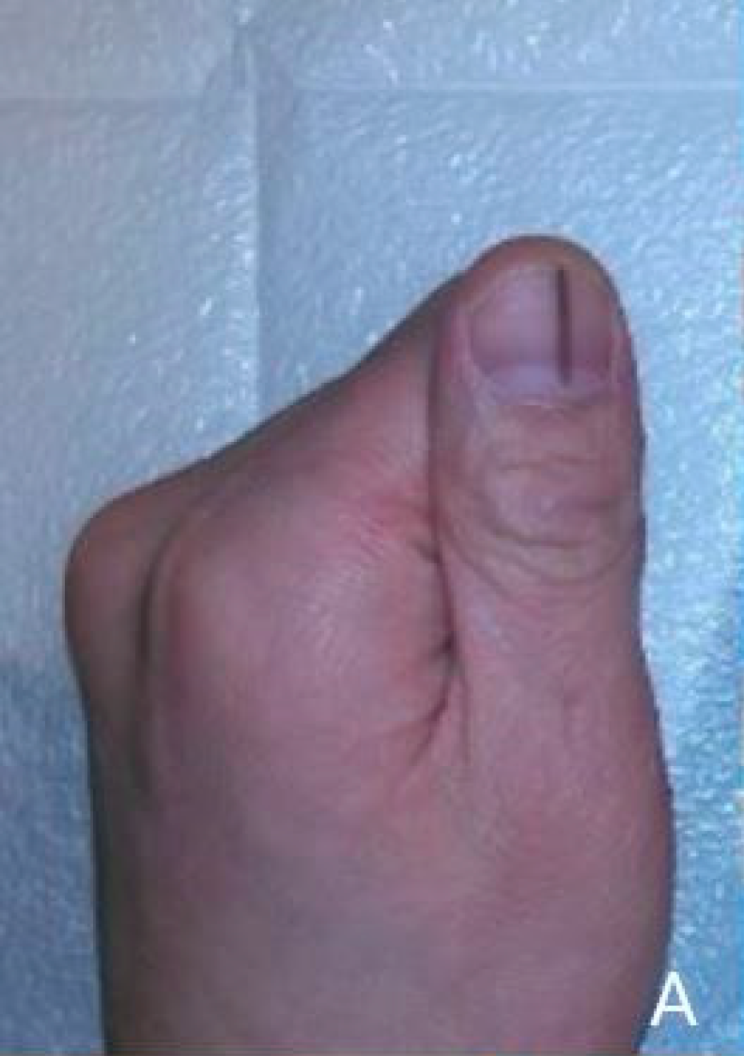
- Longitudinal melanonychia of left thumb
- Specialty: Dermatology

Melanonychia is a black or brown pigmentation of a nail, and may be present as a normal finding on many digits in Afro-Caribbeans, as a result of trauma, systematic disease, or medications, or as a postinflammatory event from such localized events as lichen planus or fixed drug eruption.

There are two types, longitudinal and transverse melanonychia.

== Signs and symptoms ==
Melanonychia is defined by a darkening of the nail plate that is brown to black; the pigment in question is typically melanin. It can affect one or more fingernails as well as toenails.

== Causes ==
Melanocytic activation and melanocyte proliferation are the two primary processes of melanonychia. Increased melanin production from a typical number of activated melanocytes in the nail matrix is referred to as melanocytotic activation. Increased melanin pigment results from a greater quantity of melanocytes within the nail matrix, which is known as melanocyte proliferation.

Both pregnancy and racial melanonychia are physiological causes of longitudinal melanonychia. People with dark skin tones, including African Americans, Asians, Hispanics, and people from the Middle East, often exhibit harmless longitudinal pigmented stripes.

It is important to investigate the possibility of onychotillomania, nail-biting, frictional trauma, and even carpal tunnel syndrome if melanonychia is linked to anomalies of the nail plate or the periungual tissues. A common cause of symmetric melanonychia that affects the great toe, the lateral and external portion of the fourth or fifth toenail, is recurrent trauma from overriding toes or poorly fitting shoes.

Skin disorders such onychomycosis, paronychia, psoriasis, lichen planus, amyloidosis, and chronic radiodermatitis can cause inflammation, which can activate melanocytes and result in the formation of a light-brown band. Melanonychia frequently develops after the inflammatory process has resolved. Nonmelanocytic tumors such as subungual linear keratosis, verruca vulgaris, subungual fibrous histiocytoma, basal cell carcinoma, myxoid pseudocyst, Bowen's disease, and onychomatricoma have also been shown to induce melanocytic activation, which leads to longitudinal melanonychia.

Systemic-related melenonychia sometimes presents as numerous bands including the fingernails and toenails. Interestingly, cutaneous and mucosal pigmentation are frequently seen in conjunction with melanonychia linked to nutritional problems, AIDS, and Addison's disease. Alcaptonuria, hemosiderosis, hyperbilirubinemia, and porphyria have all been linked to melanonychia.

Medication (particularly chemotherapy drugs), phototherapy, radiation exposure from X-rays, and electron beam therapy are examples of iatrogenic causes of melanocytic activation.

Melanonychia linked with syndromes, such as Peutz-Jeghers, Touraine, and Laugier-Hunziker, usually affects numerous digits and is accompanied by mucosal pigmented macules including the lips and oral cavity.

The most frequent cause of brown-black coloration on nails is hematomas. It can be chronic (repeated, tiny trauma) or acute (after a single large trauma).

Both dematiaceous and nondematiaceous fungi can induce fungal melanonychia; the most prevalent ones are Trichophyton rubrum and Neoscytalidium dimidiatum, followed by Alternaria and Exophiala.

== Mechanism ==
While melanocytes are found in the nail bed and matrix, most of them are dormant or quiescent. Melanocyte activation in response to trauma, infection, or inflammation starts the manufacture of melanin. Then, melanin-rich melanosomes are transported by dendrites to the developing matrix cells. The nail plate becomes visibly pigmented when these matrix cells migrate in a distal direction and mature into nail plate onychocytes. Melanonychia can also be caused by proliferation of melanocytes in the nail matrix, either with or without the formation of a nest (nevus)

== Diagnosis ==
A complete history is taken, paying close attention to the beginning, development, and potential causes of melanonychia. All twenty nails, skin, and mucous membranes are examined during the initial physical examination, bearing in mind all possible causes of brown-to-black nail coloration. The possibility that an exogenous substance on top of or beneath the nail plate is the cause of the linear nail coloring is ruled out.

Using a dermoscopy can help determine whether a biopsy is required. Because melanonychia is typically difficult to diagnose clinically, a biopsy is usually required to rule out melanoma.

=== Classification ===
Longitudinal melanonychia or melanonychia striata is distinguished by a longitudinal brown-black/grey band that runs from the cuticle or nail matrix proximally to the nail plate's distal free edge. Diffuse or total melanonychia involves the entire nail palate. Transverse melanonychia is characterized by a transverse band across the nail plate's breadth.

== Treatment ==
The underlying cause of melanonychia determines how to treat it. Regression of pigmentation may be brought on by the management of related systemic or locoregional diseases, the stopping of the offending medication, avoiding trauma, treating infections, or correcting nutritional inadequacies. Benign causes can be monitored and do not require treatment.

== Epidemiology ==
About half of instances of chromonychia are caused by melanonychia. The most prevalent morphological pattern is longitudinal melanonychia.

== See also ==
- Nail anatomy
- List of cutaneous conditions
