= Pincer nail =

- Other names: Omega nails, Trumpet nails, Pincer nail deformity
- Specialty: Dermatology

Pincer nails are a nail disorder in which the lateral edges of the nail slowly approach one another, compressing the nailbed and underlying dermis. It occurs more often in the toenails than in the fingernails.

Hereditary pincer nails have been described, although the genes or mutations causing the hereditary form are unknown.

== Signs and symptoms ==
Pincer nail is characterized by an increase in the nail's maximum transverse curvature, pushing the nail edges down into the lateral nail fold. The nail bed at the distal end along the longitudinal axis of the nail plate is also pushed down in a proximal to distal manner. The curvature that rises along the distal sides of the nail can cause individuals pain, persistent inflammation, and recurring infections.

== Causes ==
The cause of pincer nails is unknown, although it may be acquired or inherited. There have been several reports of hereditary pincer nails. Acquired pincer nails are asymmetrical in contrast to inherited pincer nails. Pincer nails are linked to a number of systemic conditions, such as amyotrophic lateral sclerosis, renal failure, gastrointestinal cancers, Kawasaki disease, and systemic lupus erythematosus.

== Diagnosis ==
Clinical differential diagnoses are necessary due to confusion between pincer and ingrown nails. Pincer nails are recognized by their morphology, while ingrown nails are recognized by their symptoms. The biggest physical distinction between pincer and ingrown nails is that the former have a transverse curve of the long axis of the nail plate that grows from proximal to distal. Additionally, the contour of the nail plate in ingrown nails stays normal as the nail steadily grows in length.

== Treatment ==
The goal of treatment is correcting the nail curvature in order to produce a nail that is aesthetically typical. There is no established course of treatment for pincer nails, but treatments can be conservative, surgical, and a combination of both. Conservative treatment is associated with recurrence/temporary remission and is a straightforward procedure. Surgical treatment has a decreased rate of recurrence, though when done improperly it can result in pain, an atypical nail appearance, secondary infection, wound necrosis, and sensory disruption.

== Epidemiology ==
Pincer nail has an incidence rate of about 0.9% and usually affects the hallux toenails on the outer, inside, and bilateral sides. Fingernails and other toenails are rarely affected.

== See also ==
- Nail anatomy
- List of cutaneous conditions
