= Habit-tic deformity =

Condition of the nail caused by external trauma to the nail matrix

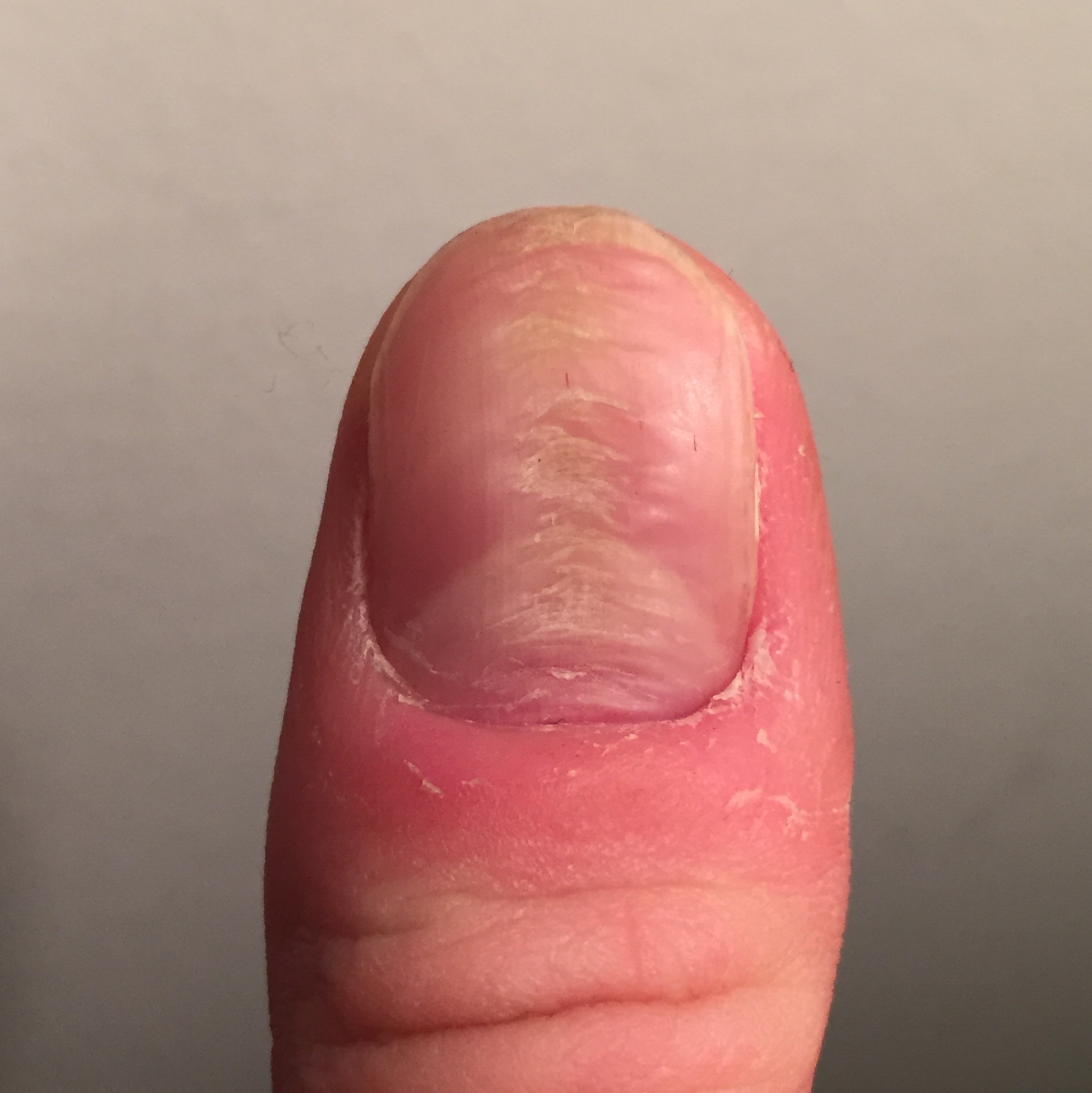
- Specialty: Dermatology
- Symptoms: Horizontal ridges on the nail, most commonly thumbnails; Damage to/absence of cuticle; Broken skin around affected nail; stress
- Causes: External trauma to proximal nail fold.
- Differential diagnosis: Median nail dystrophy, Beau's lines
- Treatment: Cyanoacrylate adhesive (instant glue), behavior therapy, habit reversal training

Habit-tic deformity is a condition of the nail caused by external trauma to the nail matrix. The condition is characterized by ridges which run horizontally across the entire nail, most often occurring on the thumbs, as well as marked damage to or absence of cuticles.

== Signs and symptoms ==
Habit-tic deformity is recognizable for its horizontal ridges that create a fir-tree shape. Discoloration along the affected area of the nail is also common. The condition is not to be confused with median nail dystrophy, a similar but rarer condition which additionally includes a canal-like vertical ridge. The deformity is most commonly seen on the thumbs, but is also less commonly seen on other nails.

== Causes ==
Habit-tic deformity is caused by long-term external trauma to the nail matrix as a result of skin-picking around the affected nail. The underlying cause is habitual skin picking as a body-focused repetitive behavior which often worsens during times of stress, boredom, or inactivity. In the past, habit-tic deformity has been linked to anxiety, tic disorder, and obsessive-compulsive disorder. However, there is no preceding anxiety and subsequent relief felt by an individual after picking, differentiating it from compulsions associated with OCD.

== Treatment ==
Cessation of trauma to the nail is an effective treatment for habit-tic deformity. Several methods have been shown to be effective, including the application of cyanoacrylate adhesive to form an artificial cuticle and promote nail root growth, as well as wearing bandages or tape to prevent picking.
