= Koilonychia =

Condition involving spoon-shaped nails

- Other names: Spoon nails
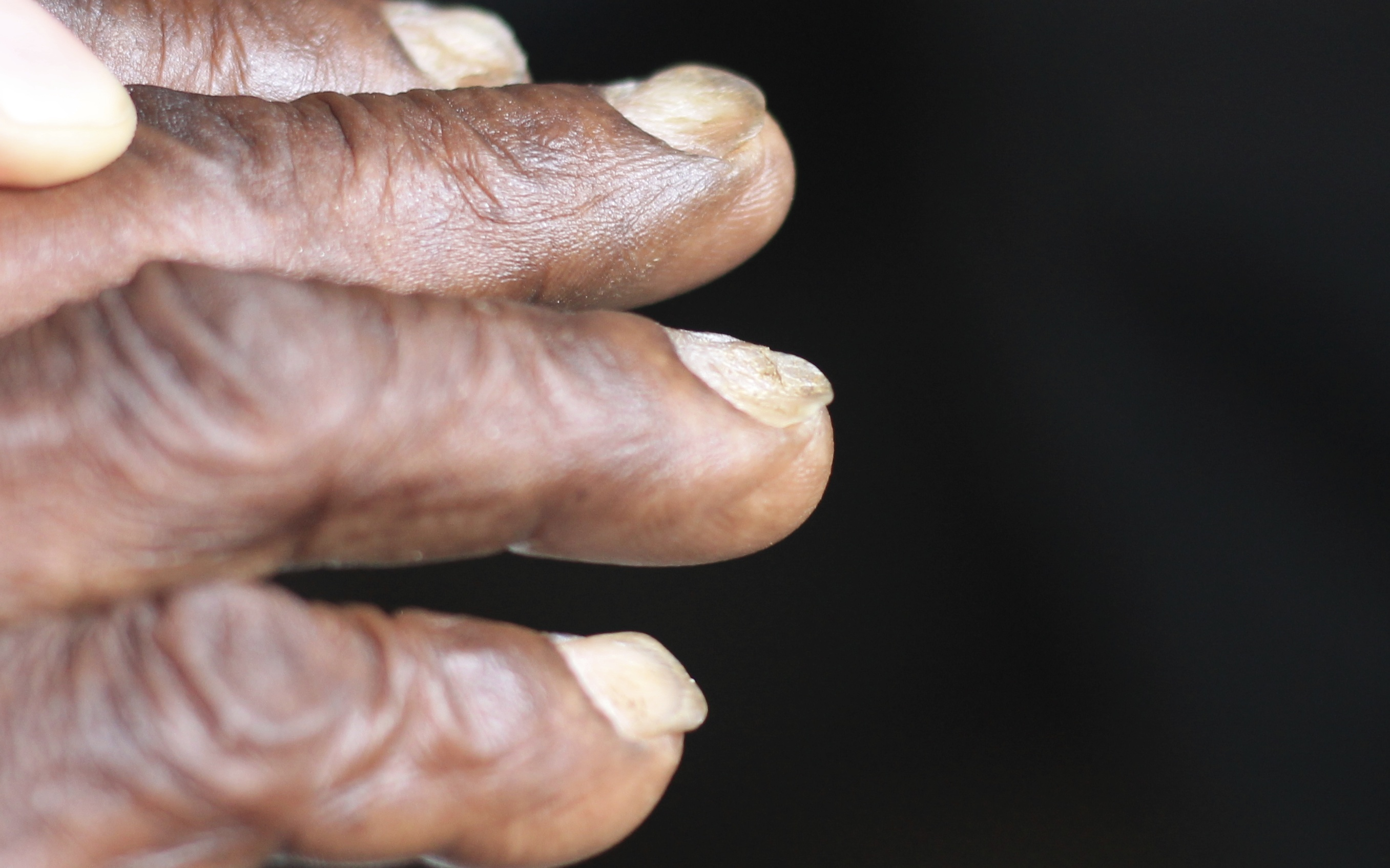
- Koilonychia
- Specialty: Dermatology

Koilonychia, also known as spoon nails, is a nail disease that can be a sign of hypochromic anemia, especially iron-deficiency anemia. It refers to abnormally thin nails (usually of the hand) which have lost their convexity, becoming flat or even concave in shape. In early stages nails may be brittle and chip or break easily.

Koilonychia is associated with Plummer–Vinson syndrome and iron deficiency anemia. It has also been associated with lichen planus, syphilis, and rheumatic fever. The term is from Greek κοῖλος (koilos) 'hollow' and ὄνυξ (onyx) 'nail'.

Even though koilonychia has been associated with iron deficiency in case reports, it is more likely seen as an occupational change in nails and may be idiopathic; ruling out iron deficiency anemia in these patients is the only work-up necessary in this condition.

== See also ==
- Kyrle disease
- List of cutaneous conditions
