= Occupational hazards of human nail dust =

Potential health effects of particles produced by podiatry drills

The use of podiatry drills, in the absence of engineering controls and personal protective equipment, is an occupational hazard to the healthcare provider. Nail dust collected during foot care procedures performed in office settings has been found to contain keratin, keratin hydrolysates, microbial debris, and viable fungal elements, including dermatophytes (most commonly Trichophyton rubrum) and saprotrophs. Exposure to nail dust and the associated risk will vary with the policies and practices in place, the type of podiatry drill used, therapy technique, frequency of procedures, personal protective equipment utilized and the use of ventilation systems.

== Nail dust generation ==
Healthcare providers may use podiatry drills on onychauxic (thickened) nails of patients to alleviate or eliminate pain, prevent or treat subungual ulcerations, allow better penetration of topical antifungal agents, or improve cosmesis, all in effort to improve the patient's quality of life. In a study conducted by Miller, 65% of respondents reported routinely drilling thickened toenails. However, the improved effectiveness of antifungal drugs such as itraconazole and terbinafine reduces the need to drill these infected nails.

Podiatry drills have a mechanical rotating burr that can be set at a range of speeds usually up to 12,000 rpm and may or may not have an integrated local ventilation extraction system. Even with the most effective dust extractors, the electric nail debridement process is not totally risk free because the extractors range from 25% - 92% effective in reducing airborne particles. While the large particles settle out to the floor, varying amounts of smaller particles remain suspended and are inhaled by or adhere to the practitioner and clinical environment. The particle sizes range from 0.1 to 100 um and 86% of these particles are less than 5 um in diameter and therefore capable of entry into the alveoli.

== Health implications ==
Fungi are ubiquitous organisms that play a vital role in decomposing organic matter. Many species of fungi live on the human body and some will infect nails causing a condition called onychomycosis. There are oral and topical antifungal therapies for this condition, however, in some instances cutting, filing, or abrading the nail may be necessary to improve cure rates. Thickened nails caused by injury, infection, diabetes, psoriasis, or vascular disease may require the use of a mechanical therapy, which can expose the healthcare worker to microbial dust.

Exposure to nail dust was first discussed and described in the literature as an occupational hazard in the early 70's. In 1975, two female chiropodists were diagnosed with allergic hypersensitivity to nail dust. Since that time, there have been a number of occupational-related complaints pertaining to airborne nail dust exposure and efforts have been made to study the podiatric professionals to determine related symptoms. Biological dust from the hand and foot care procedures may deposit in the conjunctiva, nose, and throughout the respiratory tract. The local irritation of these areas can lead to conjunctivitis, itching, tearing, rhinitis, sneezing, asthmatic attacks, bronchitis, and coughing.

The literature suggests that nail dust can be a respiratory sensitizer, which is defined as a substance that when breathed in can trigger an irreversible allergic reaction in the respiratory system. Sensitization does not usually take place immediately, but rather after months or years of exposure to the agent. Once sensitized, even the smallest amount of the substance can trigger asthma, rhinitis, or conjunctivitis that may exhibit the following symptoms: coughing, wheezing, chest tightness, runny or stuffy nose, and watery or prickly eyes. Millar found that within the podiatry profession there is four times the national prevalence of asthma. Hypersensitivity reactions are the most probable disposition for healthcare workers inhaling nail dust, although more serious lung pathology can not be ruled out

It is widely known and accepted that fungi will induce asthma, but it is estimated that only 10% of the population has allergic antibodies to fungal antigens, and half of them, that is 5% of the population, would be asymptomatic, further complicating the link between the fungal dust and troubling symptoms. Trichophyton rubrum is the most common fungal cause of nail dystrophy. Studies conducted in England found that the prevalence of trichophyton rubrum antibodies in podiatrists ranged from 14%-31%. This is evidence that the podiatrist is heavily exposed to trichophyton rubrum as observed in increased precipitating antibodies compared to the general population. It has been suggested that absorption of trichophyton fungal antigens can give rise to immunoglobulin E (IgE) antibody production, sensitization of the airways, and symptomatic asthma and rhinitis.

Nail work requiring clipping and drilling is also a potential cause for ocular injury and infection to the podiatrists, podiatric staff, and patients that are exposed to nail fragments and high-speed drills used for grinding. Possible ocular hazards result from exposure to foreign bodies, allergens, bacteria, viruses, fungi and protozoa that can be introduced at the time of eye trauma, or enter as a consequence of damage to the ocular structures; permitting the entry of opportunistic infection. The high-speed rotation of podiatry drill burrs potentially expose the healthcare worker to aerosols containing bloodborne pathogens such as Hepatitis B, Hepatitis C, or HIV. Davies et al. surveyed podiatrists and found that 41% of them complained of eye problems, particularly soreness, burning, itching and excess lacrimation.

A 1990 case illustrates the potential for ocular trauma to the healthcare provider: A podiatrist suffered a lacerated cornea when hit by a metallic shard from the grinding bit or by a fragment from the patient's toenail. The podiatrist reported fleeting periods of blurriness for several months following the incident. The healthcare worker's exposure to foreign bodies is not well documented in the literature like they are with dental staff using similar equipment; however, many of these incidents are certain to go unreported. The healthcare provider's risk of injury during nail care, however slight, warrants the use of simple and inexpensive preventative measures.

== Infections in the patients ==
There have been numerous accounts of patients with trichophyton fungal infections and associated asthma, which further substantiates the likelihood of respiratory disease transmission to the healthcare provider being exposed to the microbe-laden nail dust. In 1975, a dermatophyte fungal infection was described in a patient with severe tinea. The resulting treatment for mycosis improved the patient's asthmatic condition. The antifungal treatment of many other trichophyton foot infections has alleviated symptoms of hypersensitivity, asthma, and rhinitis.

== Control measures ==
Chronic exposure to human nail dust is a serious occupational hazard that can be minimized by not producing such dust. Best practice is to avoid electrical debridement or burring of mycotic nails unless the treatment is necessary. When the procedure is necessary, it is possible to reduce exposure by using nail dust extractors, local exhaust, good housekeeping techniques, personal protective equipment such as gloves, glasses or goggles, face shields, and an appropriately fitted disposable respirators to protect against the hazards of nail dust and flying debris.

== See also ==
- Nail disease
- Allergy
- Hypersensitivity
- Occupational asthma
