= Acral fibrokeratoma =

- Other names: Acquired digital fibrokeratoma
- Specialty: Dermatology

Acral fibrokeratoma, also known as an acquired digital fibrokeratoma, and acquired periungual fibrokeratoma is a skin lesion characterized by a pinkish, hyperkeratotic, hornlike projection occurring on a finger, toe, or palm.

== Signs and symptoms ==
Acral fibrokeratoma typically manifest as a non-symptomatic protuberance that does not go away on its own. In a clinical setting, it manifests as a single, well-defined, skin-colored papule with a distinctive hyperkeratotic collarette at the base. Though it can also be found in other places like the lower lip, nose, elbow, pre-patellar region, and periungual tissue, it mostly affects the fingers and toes. Usually, the lesion is smaller than 1 cm, however reports of acral fibrokeratomas larger than 1 cm, known as giant acral fibrokeratomas, have been made.

== Causes ==
Although the exact cause of acral fibrokeratoma is unknown, prolonged irritation or trauma, particularly in the acral regions, have been suggested as potential contributing factors. In particular, it is thought that acral fibrokeratoma is exacerbated by recurrent trauma to the same location. This explains why the more frequently damaged areas are the acral regions, which are prone to severe trauma daily.

== Diagnosis ==
The histopathologic examination of acral fibrokeratoma usually shows hyperkeratosis and uneven acanthosis in the epidermis; dense, interwoven collagen bundles with dilated capillaries primarily oriented along the lesion's long axis comprise the lesion's core.

== Treatment ==
There are reports of several treatment options for acral fibrokeratoma, including curettage, cauterization, shave excision, and cryotherapy. Nonetheless, surgical excision is regarded as the principal and most successful form of treatment.

== See also ==
- Skin lesion
- List of cutaneous conditions
