= Psoriatic onychodystrophy =

- Other names: Psoriatic nails, Psoriatic onychopathy
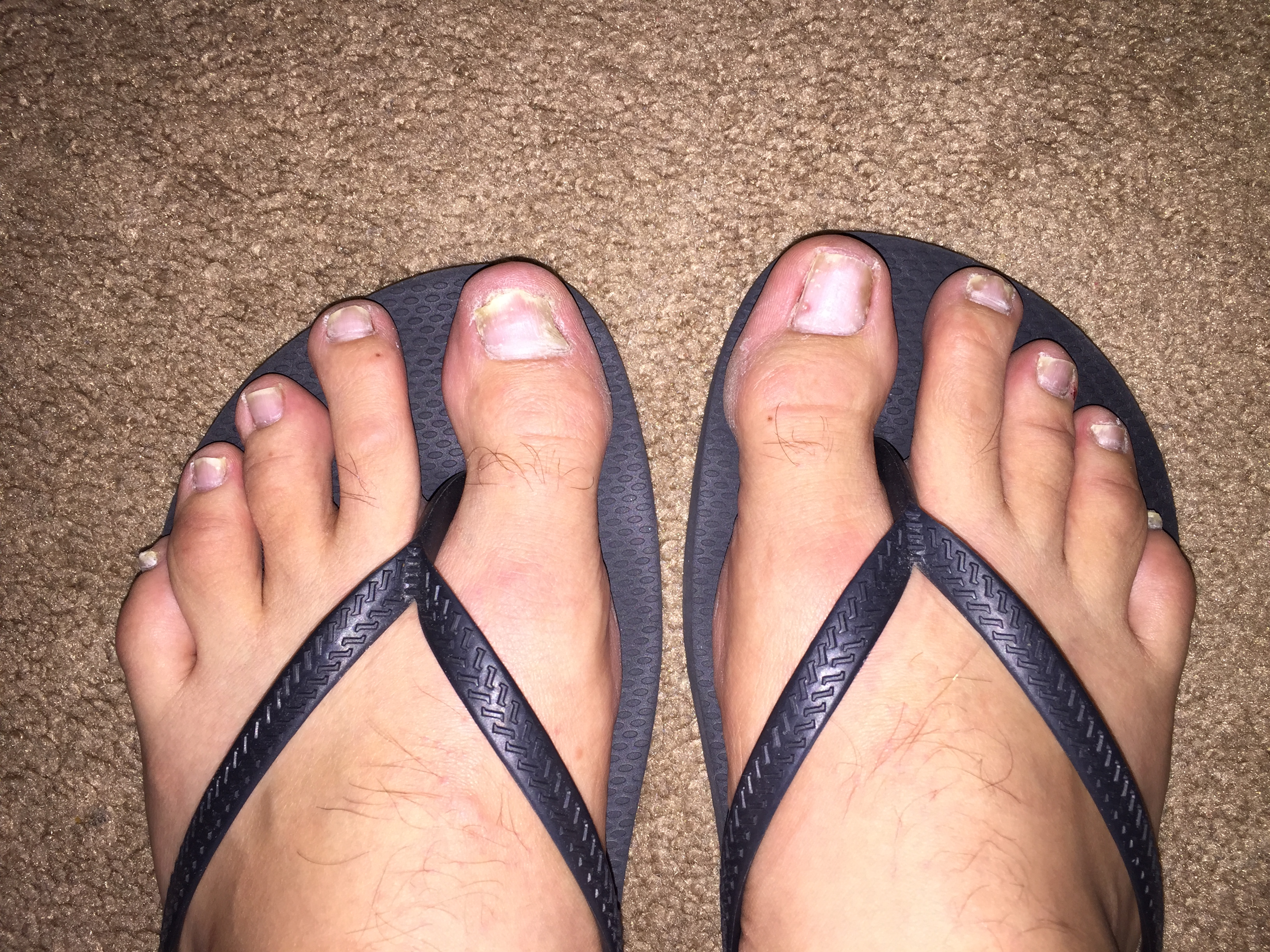
- Psoriasis of the toenails
- Specialty: Dermatology
- Causes: Psoriasis
- Differential diagnosis: Onychomycosis
- Treatment: Medications, radiation
- Frequency: 10% to 78% of those with psoriasis

Psoriatic onychodystrophy (also termed psoriatic nails or psoriatic onychopathy) is a nail disease which is common in those with psoriasis, with reported incidences varying from 10% to 78%. Elderly patients and those with psoriatic arthritis are more likely to have psoriatic nails.

== Symptoms ==
Psoriatic nails are characterized by a translucent discolouration in the nail bed that resembles a drop of oil beneath the nail plate. Early signs that may accompany the "oil drop" include thickening of the lateral edges of the nail bed with or without resultant flattening or concavity of the nail; separation of the nail from the underlying nail bed, often in thin streaks from the tip-edge to the cuticle; sharp peaked "roof-ridge" raised lines from cuticle to tip; or separation of superficial layers of the nail followed by loss of patches of these superficial layers, leaving thin red nails beneath; or nail pitting–punctate changes along the nail plate surface.

== Causes ==
The causes of nail psoriasis are unknown. It has been suggested that fungi may play a role.

== Diagnosis ==
The Nail Psoriasis Severity Index (NAPSI) is a numeric, reproducible, objective, simple tool for evaluation of nail psoriasis. It evaluates several signs separately, each on a 1–3 scale: pitting, Beau's lines, subungual hyperkeratosis and onycholysis. A 2005 study proposed a modified NAPSI scale for persons with psoriasis and named the title of their publication "Modification of the Nail Psoriasis Severity Index". Then, in 2007, a study found that there was a high level of inter-rater variability of the 2003 NAPSI scale and proposed another index which was, like the 2005 article, a modification of the 2003 article, and was named modified NAPSI.

A 2008 study found that Cannavo's qualitative system correlated with NAPSI (p<0.001) and is less time-consuming.

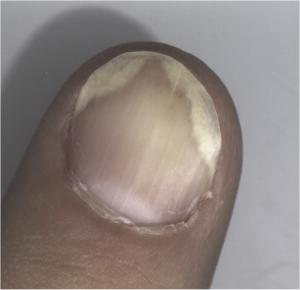
Onycholysis: Separation of the nail plate from the nail bed

There is a risk of misdiagnosis with onychomycosis.

== Treatment ==
There exist numerous treatments for nail psoriasis but there is little information concerning their effectiveness and safety. Treatments include topical, intralesional, radiation, systemic, and combination therapies.

- Tacalcitol ointment obtains a significant improvement in all nail parameters, both of the matrix and of the bed.
- Clobetasol nail lacquer and tacalcitol ointment
- 5-fluorouracil. A reported side-effect is yellow nails
- Calcipotriol
- Calcipotriol plus betamethasone dipropionate ointment.
- Efalizumab
- Infliximab
- Golimumab
- Low dose methotrexate
- Intralesional corticosteroid injection

=== Relative effectiveness of treatments ===
Available studies lack sufficient power to extrapolate a standardized therapeutic regimen.

As of April 2009, an assessment of the evidence for the efficacy and safety of the treatments for nail psoriasis is in progress.

- Infliximab appears to be the most effective treatment for nail psoriasis to date.
- Results from low-dose acitretin therapy show NAPSI score reductions comparable with those studies evaluating biologic drugs for nail psoriasis and suggest that low-dose systemic acitretin should be considered in the treatment of nail psoriasis.

A 2013 meta-analysis showed improvement of nail psoriasis with infliximab, golimumab, superficial radiotherapy, electron beam, and grenz rays compared to placebo. Although systemic therapies have been shown to be beneficial, they may have serious adverse effects. Topical treatments have not been well studied but may be beneficial.

== Research ==
Active clinical trials investigating nail psoriasis:

=== Phase IV ===
- Effects of Etanercept.
- Effects of Golimumab.

=== Phase II ===
- Dose response and safety of topical Methotrexate.

== See also ==
- Psoriasis
- Nail disease
