= Ingrown nail =

- Other names: Unguis incarnatus or Ingrown toenail
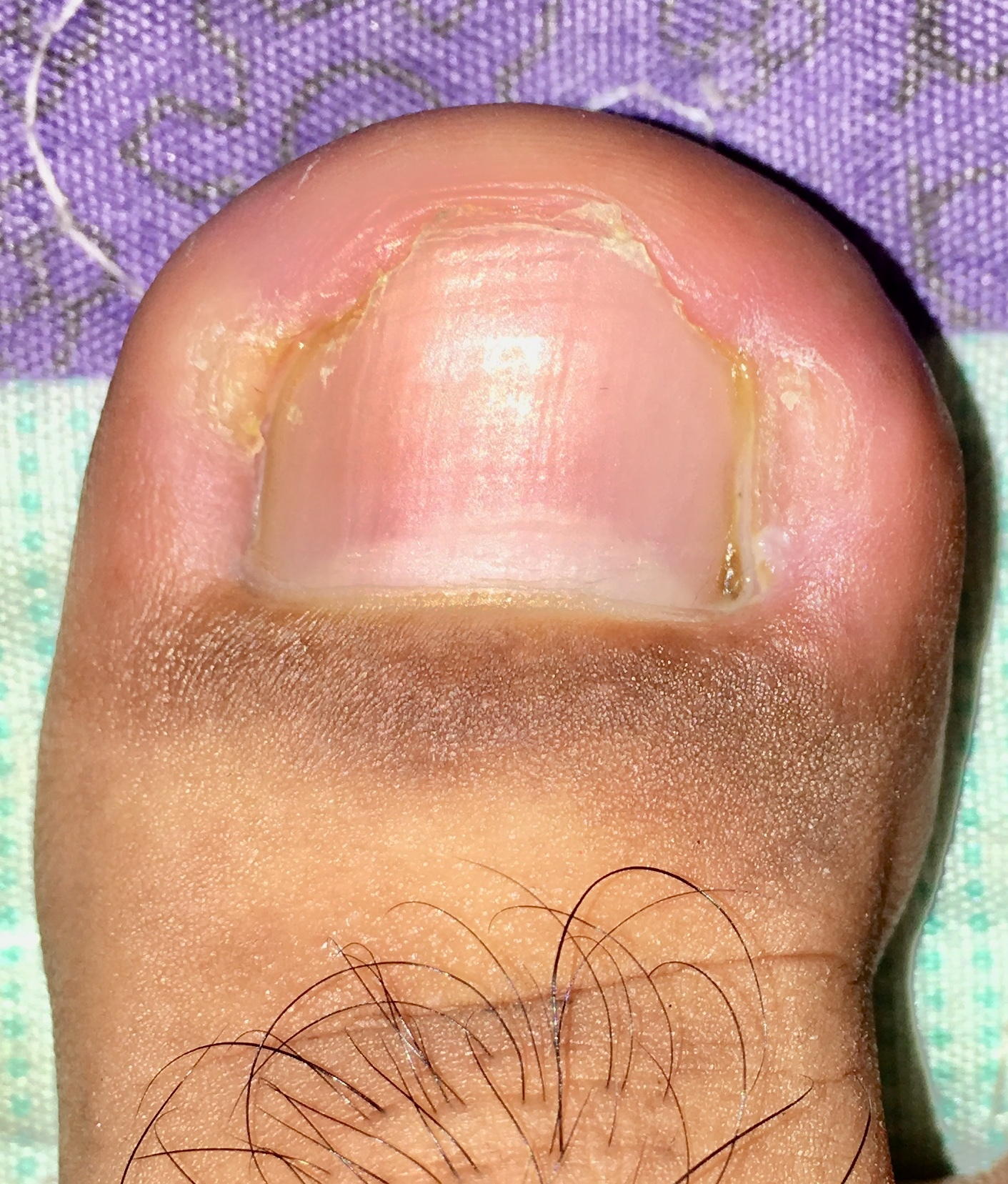
- Ingrown nail in the hallux (big toe)
- Specialty: Orthopedics

An ingrown nail, also known as onychocryptosis (from Ancient Greek: ὄνυξ, romanized: ónux, lit. 'nail'; and κρυπτός, kruptós, 'hidden') is a common form of nail disease. It is an often painful condition in which the nail grows so that it cuts into one or both sides of the paronychium or nail bed. While any nail can become ingrown, wearing shoes causes the toenails to grow in more often.

A common misconception is that the cause of an ingrown toenail is the nail growing into the paronychium, but it can also be caused by overgrown toe skin. The condition is caused by a microbial inflammation of the paronychium causing a granuloma within which the nail is buried. A true ingrown toenail is caused by actual penetration of flesh by a sliver of toenail.

== Signs and symptoms ==
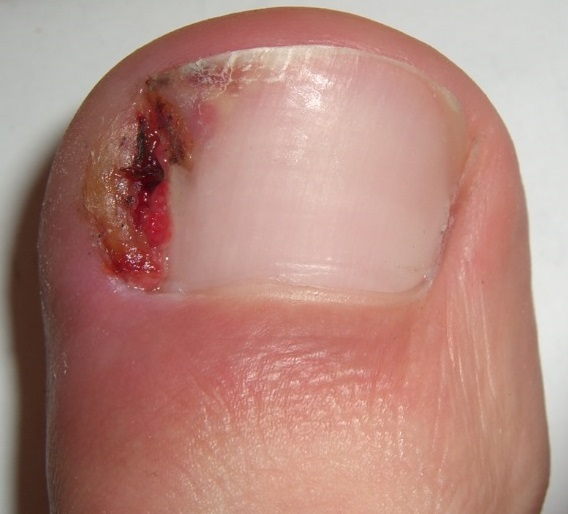
An ingrown and infected toenail on the hallux (big toe) of the right foot

Symptoms include pain along the margins of the nail caused by hypergranulation, worsening of pain when wearing tight footwear, and sensitivity to pressure of any kind (in some cases this pressure can be as light as the weight of bedsheets). Bumping of an affected toe can cause pain as the nail's surrounding tissue is punctured further. Ingrown nails can become easily infected unless care is taken early to treat the condition.

Signs of infection include redness and swelling of the area around the nail, drainage of pus, and watery discharge tinged with blood. The main symptom is swelling at the base of the nail on the ingrowing side (though it may be present on both sides).

Onychocryptosis should not be confused with irregular nail growth patterns such as convex nails, involuted nails, or pincer nails. It also should not be confused with the presence of small corns, callus, or debris down the nail sulci.

== Causes ==
The main contributor to onychocryptosis is footwear, particularly ill-fitting shoes with inadequate toe box room and tight stockings that apply pressure to the top or side of the foot. Other factors may include the damp atmosphere of enclosed shoes, which soften the nail plate and cause swelling on the epidermal keratin (eventually increasing the convex arch permanently), genetics, trauma, and disease. Improper cutting of the nail may cause the nail to cut into the side-fold skin from growth and impact, whether or not the nail is truly "ingrown". The nail bends inwards or upwards depending on the angle of its cut. If the cutting tool, such as scissors, is at an attitude in which the lower blade is closer to the toe than the upper blade, the toenail will tend to grow upwards from its base, and vice versa. The process is visible along the nail as it grows, appearing as a warp advancing to the end of the nail. The upper corners turn more easily than the center of the nail tip. Holding the tool at the same angle for all nails may induce these conditions; as the nail turns closer to the skin, it becomes harder to fit the lower blade in the right attitude under the nail. When cutting a nail, it is not just the correct angle that is important, but also how short it is cut. A shorter cut will bend the nail more, unless the cut is even on both top and bottom of the nail.

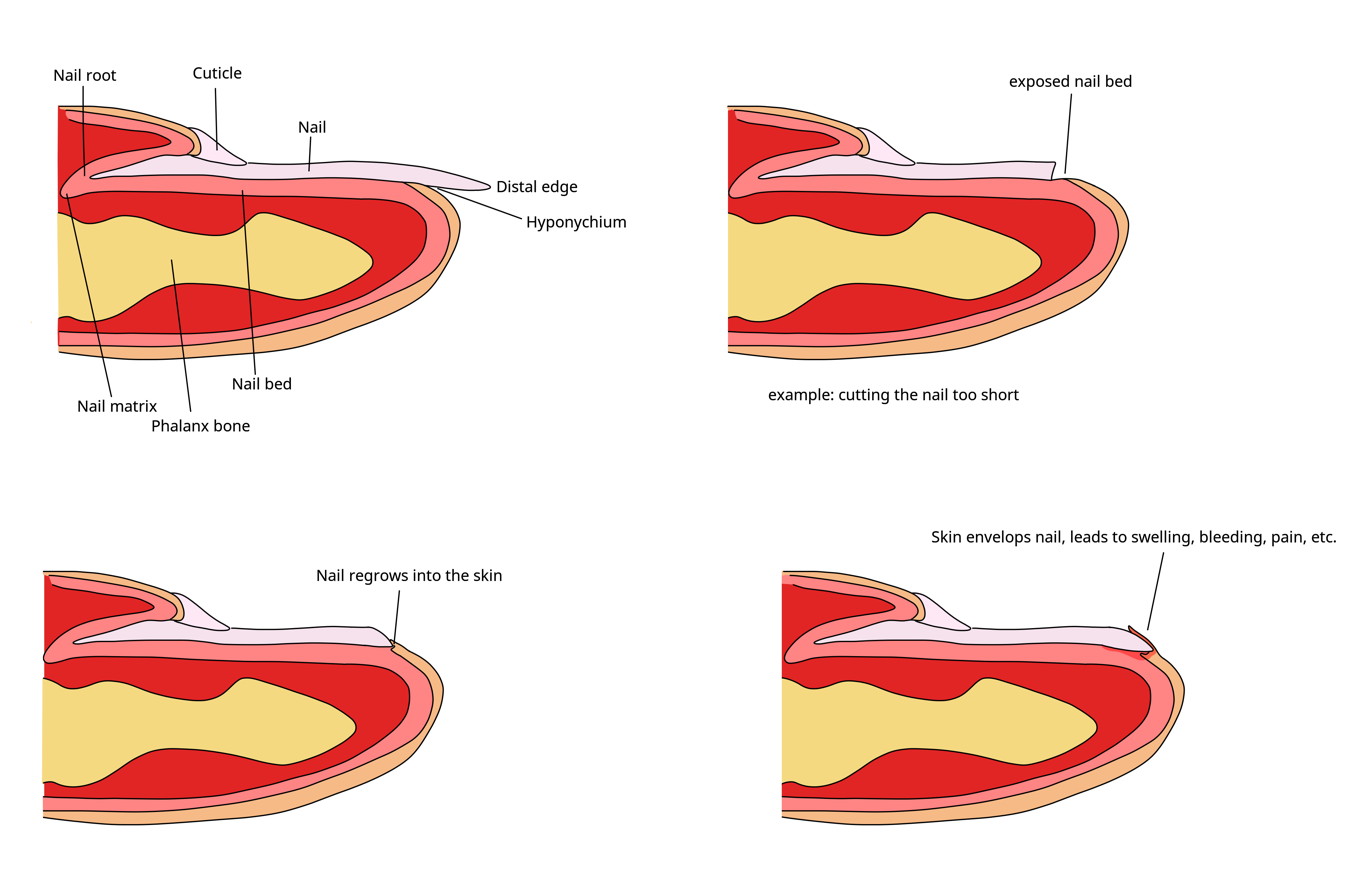
Simple representation of the formation of ingrown nails

Causes may include:

- Shoes causing a bunching of the toes in the developmental stages of the foot (frequently in people under 21), which can cause the nail to curl and dig into the skin. This is particularly the case in ill-fitting shoes that are too narrow or too short, but any toed shoes may cause an ingrown nail.
- Poor nail care, including cutting the nail too short, rounded off at the tip or peeled off at the edges instead of being cut straight across.
- Broken toenails.
- Trauma to the nail plate or toe, which can occur by dropping objects on or stubbing the toenail, or by the nail protruding through the shoe (as during sports or other vigorous activity), can cause the flesh to become injured and the nail to grow irregularly and press into the flesh.
- Predisposition, such as abnormally shaped nail beds, nail deformities caused by diseases or a genetic susceptibility, increases the chance of an ingrown nail, but the ingrowth cannot occur without pressure from a shoe.
- A bacterial infection, treatable with antibiotics.

One study compared patients with ingrown toenails to healthy controls and found no difference in the shape of toenails between those of patients and of the control group. The study suggested that treatment should not be based on the correction of a non-existent nail deformity. In some cases, however, there is nail deformity.

Ingrown toenails are caused by weight-bearing (activities such as walking and running) in patients that have too much soft skin tissue on the sides of their nail. Weight bearing causes this excessive amount of skin to bulge up along the sides of the nail. The pressure on the skin around the nail results in the tissue being damaged, resulting in swelling, redness and infection. Many treatments are directed at the nail itself and often include partial or full removal of the healthy nail. However, failure to treat the cutaneous condition can result in a return of the ingrowth and a deformity or mutilation of the nail.

== Prevention ==
The most common digit to become ingrown is the big toe, but ingrowth can occur on any nail. Ingrown nails can be avoided by cutting nails straight across; not along a curve, not too short and no shorter than the flesh around it. Footwear that is too small or too narrow, or with too shallow a "toe box", will exacerbate any underlying problem with a toenail. Sharp square corners may be uncomfortable and cause snagging on socks, so filing of the corners is reasonable. Proper cutting leaves the leading edge of the nail free of the flesh, precluding it from growing into the toe.

Some nails require cutting of the corners far back to remove edges that dig into the flesh; this is often done as a partial wedge resection by a podiatrist. Ingrown toe nails can be caused by injury, commonly blunt trauma in which the flesh is pressed against the nail causing a small cut that swells. Injury to the nail can cause it to grow abnormally, making it wider or thicker than normal, or even bulged or crooked.

== Management ==
The treatment of an ingrown toenail partly depends on its severity.

=== Conservative treatment ===
Mild to moderate cases are often treated conservatively with warm water and epsom salt soaks, antibacterial ointment and the use of dental floss. If conservative treatment of a minor ingrown toenail does not succeed, or if the ingrown toenail is severe, surgical treatment may be required. A "gutter splint" may be improvised by slicing a cotton-tipped wooden applicator diagonally to form a bevel and using this to insert a wisp of cotton from the applicator head under the nail to lift it from the underlying skin after a foot soak.

Some over-the-counter ingrown toenail pain relief kits include a sodium sulfide gel with cushions and elastic bandages.

=== Nail bracing ===
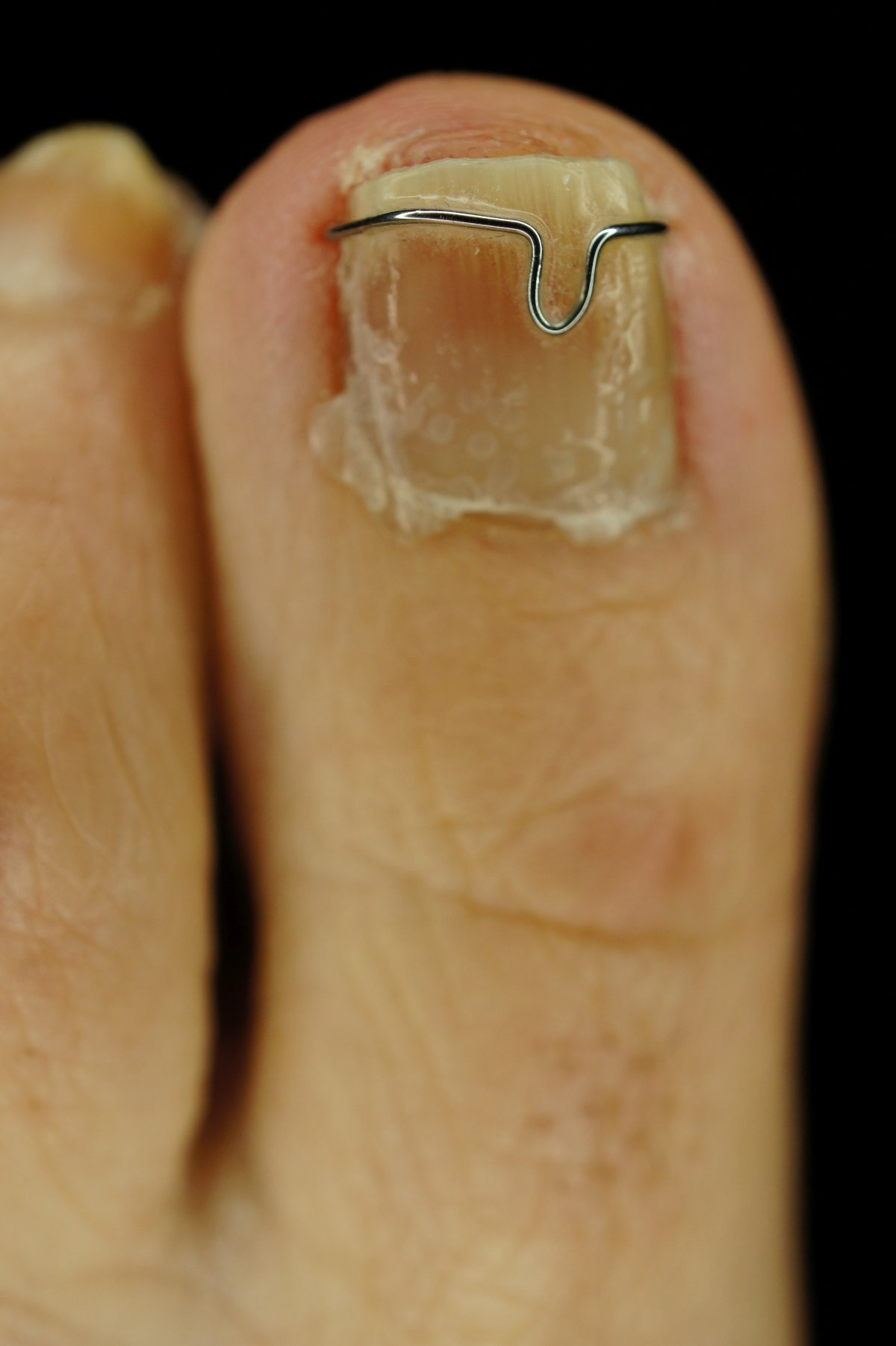
A nail with an orthonyxic brace installed

Nail bracing is more conservative than surgery, but less widely used. Nail braces work by gently lifting the sides of the toenail and eventually retraining the nail to grow to a flatter shape over time. The total time needed for the nail to be reshaped is one full nail growth or about 18 months. There are two main types of nail braces: adhesive and hooked. Adhesive nail braces are generally made of a thin strip of composite material that is glued to the top of the nail. The strip naturally tries to return to a flat state and lifts the edges of the nails in the process. Hooked nail braces consist of a hook (usually made of dental wire) placed under either side of the nail with some type of tensioning system pulling the hooks together.

Because of the curved shape of the nail, the tensioning device rests on the higher middle of the nail by applying upward pressure to the sides of the nail. In studies of diabetics, who need to avoid surgery when possible, nail bracing was found to be effective at providing immediate, as well as long-term, relief.

=== Surgery ===
Surgical treatment for an ingrown nail is carried out by a podiatrist, a foot and ankle specialist. This is typically an in-office procedure requiring local anesthesia and special surgical instruments. The surgical approach is the removal of the offending part of the nail plate known as a wedge resection. If the ingrown toenail recurs despite this treatment, destruction of the sides of the nail with chemicals or excision is done; this is known as a matrixectomy. Antibiotics may be used after the procedure but are not recommended, as they may delay healing. Surgical treatment for ingrown nails is more effective at preventing the nail from regrowing inwards compared to non-surgical treatments.

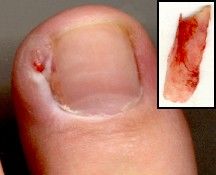
A toe following wedge resection with an image of the nail removed
