= Lunula (anatomy) =

Crescent-shaped whitish bed of a fingernail or toenail

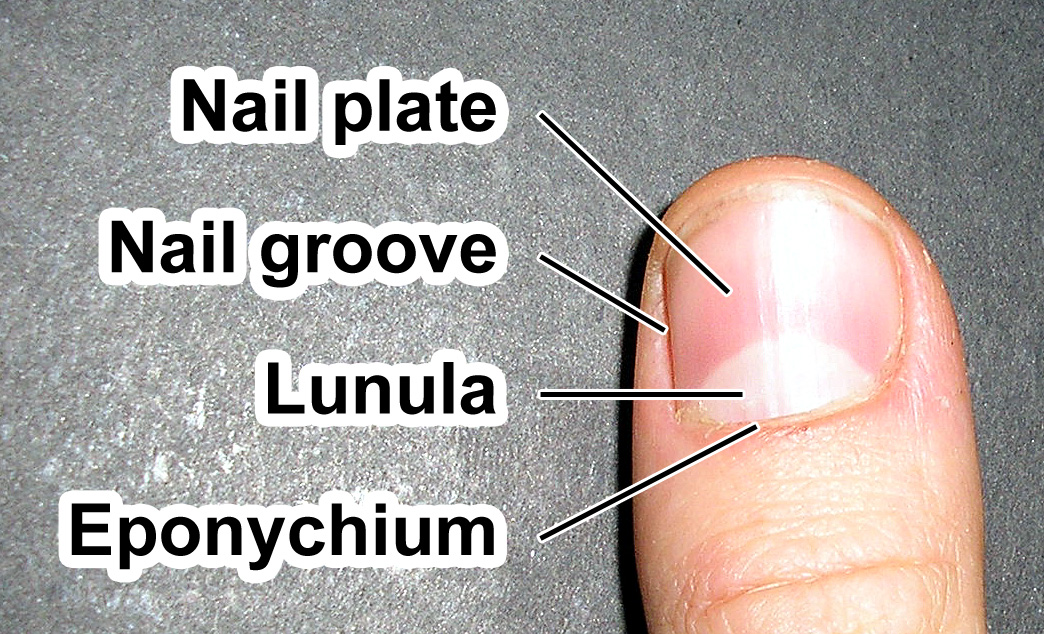
- The lunula is the white crescent-shaped area at the base of a nail.

Details
- Part of: Fingernail or toenail

Identifiers
- Latin: lunula
- TA98: A16.0.01.005
- TA2: 7067
- TH: H3.12.00.3.02006
- FMA: 77858

The lunula (pl.: lunulae; from Latin 'little moon') is the crescent-shaped whitish area of the bed of a fingernail or toenail.

In humans, it appears by week 14 of gestation, and has a primary structural role in defining the free edge of the distal nail plate (the part of the nail that grows outward).

== Appearance ==
The lunula is located at the end of the nail that is closest to the skin of the finger, but it still lies under the nail. It is not actually white but only appears so when it is seen through the nail. Outlining the nail matrix, the lunula is a very delicate part of the nail structure. If one damages the lunula, the nail will be permanently deformed. Even when the totality of the nail is removed, the lunula remains in place and is similar in appearance to another smaller fingernail embedded in the nail bed.

In most cases, it is half-moon-shaped and has unique histologic features. Examinations concluded that the lunula is an area of loose dermis with lesser developed collagen bundles. It appears whitish because a thickened underlying stratum basale obscures the underlying blood vessels.

The lunula is most noticeable on the thumb; however, not everyone's lunulae are visible. In some cases, the eponychium may partially or completely cover the lunula.

== Importance ==
Having no lunula may be normal; though, it may also indicate malnourishment, anemia, kidney problems, or heart disease.

== See also ==
- Nail disease
