= Nail technician =

Person who styles nails

A nail technician at work

A nail technician or nail stylist is a person whose occupation is to style and shape finger and toe nails. This is achieved using a combination of decorating nails with colored varnish, transfers, gems, or glitter. Basic treatments include manicures and pedicures, as well as cleaning and filing nails and applying overlays or extensions. Services are typically offered at a nail salon.

Using a stencil or stamping, nail stylists can also paint designs onto nails with an airbrush by hand. A nail stylist will often complete a consultation with the client to check for any signs of skin problems, deformities, or nail disease before treatment; advise clients about looking after their hands and nails, and recommend nail care products.

Training to become a nail stylist involves completing a professional course that normally takes at least a year. Courses will more than likely cover the anatomy and physiology of the nails, hands, arms, feet, and legs; contraindications that may arise, identifying diseases and disorders, proper sanitation and sterilizing techniques, how to perform nail services safely, gel polish application, liquid and powder enhancements and hard gel enhancements. The work itself tends to take place in a beauty salon, although some nail stylists will make house calls to clients. Once licensed, many nail stylists will keep their own regular client list. The basic equipment needed to carry out nail services can be easily obtained. Types of basic equipment can include nail drills, brushes, gel polish, and a UV lamp. Specialist equipment will be needed for specific nail applications.

== Occupational hazards ==
=== Chemical exposures ===
In the United States there are approximately 400,000 nail technicians registered and occupational exposures to chemical hazards is recognized as a concern in this profession. The significant health impacts of these chemicals are marginalized as a majority of this workforce is women of reproductive age.

These nail salons use a wide variety of supplies that have high levels of acrylates, parabens, phthalates and volatile organic compounds (VOCs). It has been found that these chemical exposures can be linked to respiratory, reproductive, and neurological health issues and most of these supplies are carcinogenic. Additionally, the exposure of the endocrine disruptors in phthalates found in nail products is of note. A study of Canadian nail salons proved that these phthalates are aerosolized and causing chronic health effects. The VOCs are an added concern for nail technicians. A study in 2019 was one of the first of its kind to measure biomarkers for VOCs in nail technicians pre and post shift. It was found that toluene levels were significantly higher in workers blood post shift. Consistent exposure to toluene can cause severe damage to the central nervous system, with symptoms like motor dysfunction and limb paralysis.

It is necessary that education be spread on their hazards and more research should be done in order for effective personal protective equipment to be chosen upon. These education measures are necessary and critical to ensure the health and safety of workers. With a majority of these workers being young women of color it is additionally important that recognition of the severity of the damage these chemical exposures cause to avoid further marginalization of this community. The increased risk of those who are pregnant furthers the need for workplace safety in nail salons.

The Occupational Safety and Health Administration (OSHA) has provided guidelines on ways to mitigate the impact of these harsh chemical exposures. However, these regulations point out that they are still insufficient from eliminating hazards and policies still need to be strengthened in order to ensure proper safety.

=== Ergonomic hazards ===
Ergonomics is the strategical process of changing a work environment to better fit a job to the employees capabilities. Ergonomics wants to create a strong connection between the body and mind with its workplace. The job of a nail technician involves a lot of repetitive movements, bending over and sitting for long periods of time. This could lead to health problems in the muscles, joints, or spine. This health problems are known as musculoskeletal disorders (MSDs). The goal of ergonomics is to make any modifications to a work environment to help the employee both physically and mentally when working.

Possible modifications towards better posture includes adjustable chairs that can helps support the back and ensure sitting at a 90-degree angle. Lighting for precise artwork can also be adjusted to facilitate good posture. When performing tedious repetitive movements such as filing or polishing they should make sure their hands and wrists are kept straight and not bent. Lastly, placing arms at the end of the table and use a towel or any form of padding to soften the edge can minimize localized pressure point during repetitive work.

== Notable nail technicians ==
- Park Eun-kyung
- Bernadette Thompson
- Deborah Lippmann
- Jenny Bui
