= Queer manicure =

Fashion of manicure

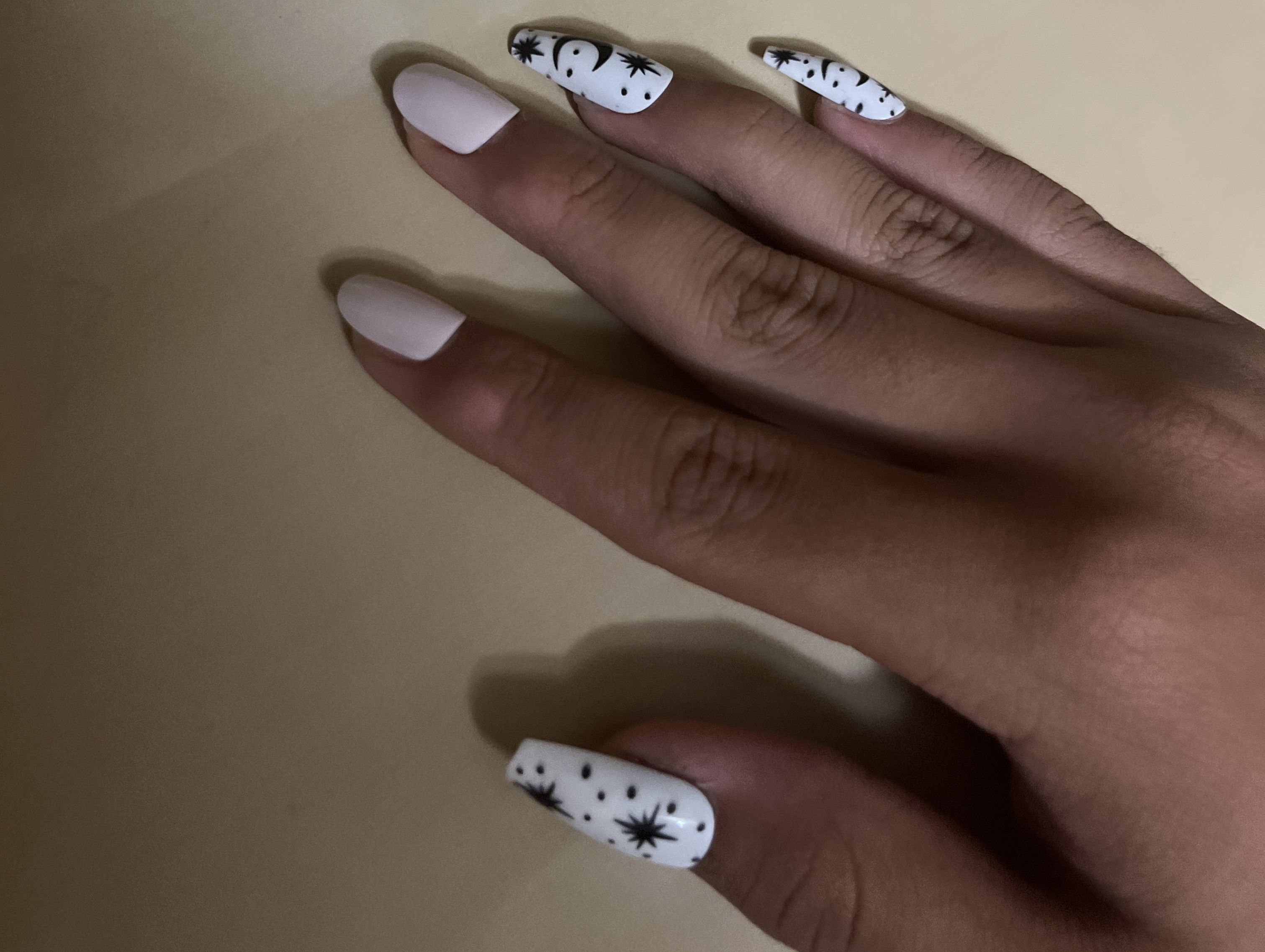
An example of a lesbian manicure (right-handed)

A queer manicure (also known as a lesbian manicure, lesbian nails, femmicure etc. (Note: From the LGBTQ slang terms queer and femme respectively.)) is a style or trend of manicure intended to allow lesbians and other queer people in the LGBTQ community to safely and easily perform digital penetration during sex. The most distinct and modern form of the manicure entails long nail extensions on every finger apart from the index finger, middle finger, and sometimes thumb of the dominant hand, thus preventing injury or discomfort to the vulva or vagina during intercourse while otherwise maintaining the fashion of long acrylic nails in one's daily life. The style is often seen as a public expression or symbol of lesbian identity, particularly on the femme side of the femme–butch spectrum, while manicure and nail art are more broadly seen as a recurring topic across the community and are frequently seen in spaces such as the drag subculture.

== History and culture ==
The lesbian community has historically been closely associated with unilaterally short nails, such that a 2018 poll by the queer women's website Autostraddle found that 95% of respondents wore short nails, and the length of a woman's nails was sometimes associated in popular culture as a factor in "gaydar". Lesbian women have sometimes described studying a woman's hands, nails, or fingers to evaluate them as a potential partner.

The portrayal of short nails as a "standard" among queer women was popularized by works of queer fiction like The L Word, though this is sometimes considered a stereotype. The combination of differing nail lengths arose as a compromise between an aesthetic preference for long, sharp nails, particularly among femme lesbians, and the practicality of using the index and middle fingers, nicknamed the "party fingers", for vaginal penetration during intercourse between women. Both shorter nails overall and the 'party fingers' style of manicure have become symbols of lesbian pride or a form of mutual identification between queer women in public.

The style and its significance to the lesbian community was praised in the Los Angeles Times, but it also included a warning by Canadian writer Kinsey Clarke, who wears the style herself, against centering more affluent white women when discussing symbols of lesbian culture. Other proponents of the manicure include Mina Q, a Los Angeles stand-up performer, and Natalie Minerva, a professional nail artist for HBO's Euphoria responsible for the middle-and-index style sported by star Barbie Ferreira. A writer for Allure also spoke of her favorable experience with the sex positivity surrounding the manicure and its growing visibility.

== See also ==
- Lipstick lesbian
- LGBTQ symbols
  - Pride flags, often used as a basis for queer nail art
- Handkerchief code
