= Nail art =

Decoration of fingernails and toenails

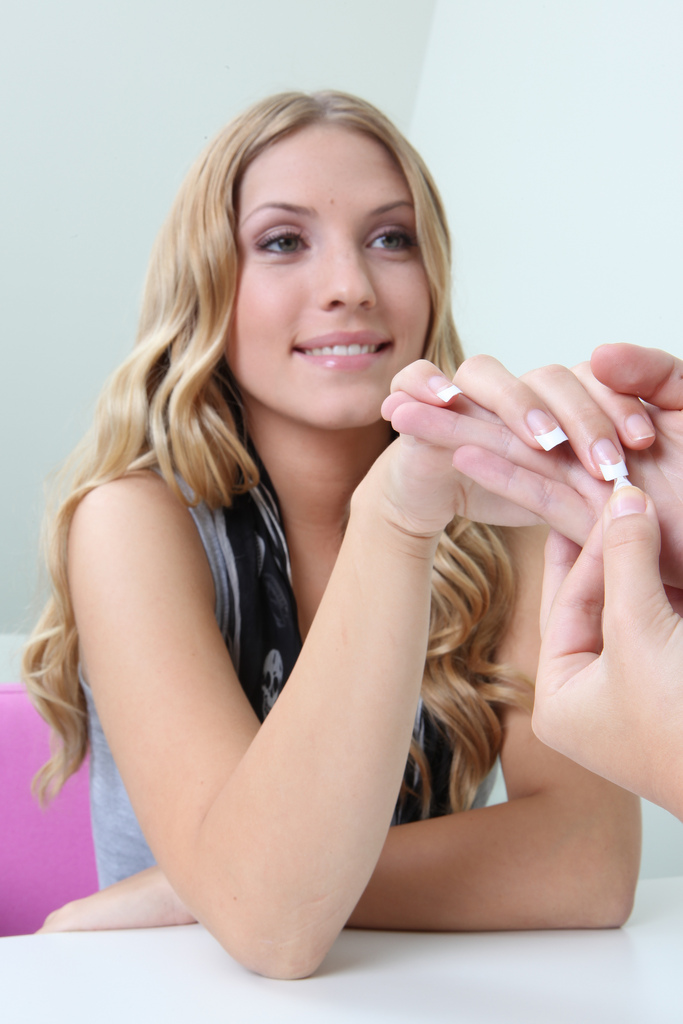
French manicure

Nail art is a creative way to paint, decorate, enhance, and embellish nails. It is a type of artwork that can be done on fingernails and toenails, usually after manicures or pedicures.

== History ==
The exact origin of nail treatments is unclear since they appear to have originated in different parts of the world around the same time. In ancient Egypt, from 5000 to 3000 BC, women would dye their nails with henna to indicate social status and seductiveness. Women of the lower class wore pastel and neutral shades, while the upper classes wore deep, bright shades. In Babylonia, 3200 BC, men, not women, painted their nails with black and green kohl, an ancient cosmetic. To prepare for war, warriors of Babylon spent hours having their nails prepared, hair curled, and other similar beauty treatments.

As in ancient Egypt, nail color indicated one's status, black for noblemen and green for the common man. Around the same time, in 3000 BC, the first nail polish originated in ancient China.The Chinese first would put porcelan false fingertips on as a symbol of their class. It was made from beeswax, egg whites, gelatin, vegetable dyes, and gum arabic. Chinese dipped their nails in this mixture for several hours or left it on to dry. Colors ranged from pink to red, depending on the mix of the ingredients. During the Zhou Dynasty, 600 BC, royalty used this simple nail polish with gold and silver dust on their nails to show their social status.

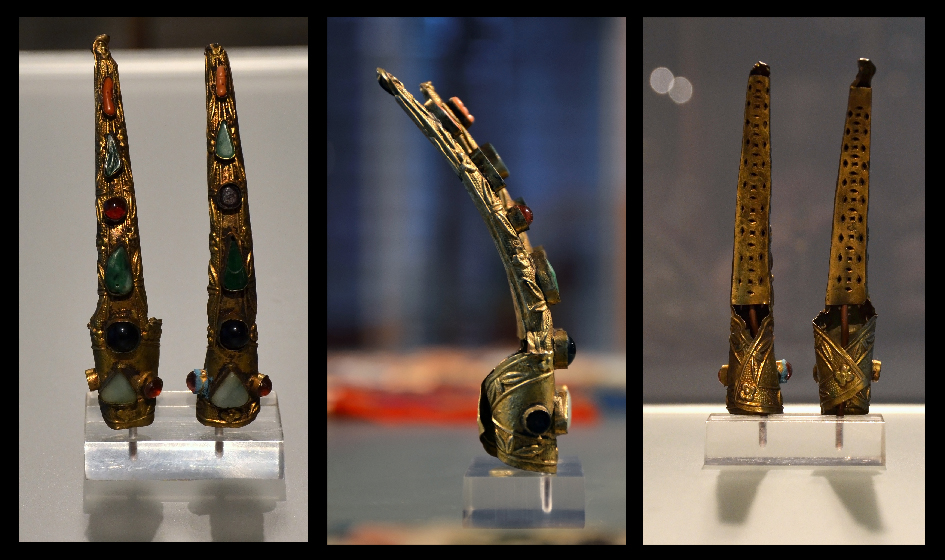
Nail protectors from China around 1900–1910

The Ming dynasty (1368-1644) was known for extremely long nails. Sometimes, these nails were protected by gold- and jewel-encrusted nail guards. Servants performed personal chores for the royals so their nails did not break or become damaged. Empress Dowager Cixi of China, who ruled from 1835 to 1908, was known for her long nails. Many photos show the empress with 6-inch-long gold guards protecting her long nails. A lot of these above did not use nail art as it is widely known today, only stained, dyed, or dusted the fingernails and toenails. The first actual record of nail art was from the short-lived Inca Empire (1438-1533), one of the largest empires in South America. Incas decorated their nails by painting eagles on them.

In 1770, the first fancy gold and silver manicure sets were created. French King Louis XVI, who ruled from 1774 until his deposition in 1792, always had his nails taken care of using these sets.

In the early 1800s, the modern manicure developed with the invention of the orange stick, a thin wooden stick with one pointy end, usually made from orange wood. It was invented in 1830, by Dr. Sitts, a European podiatrist, who adapted a dental tool for manicure purposes. Before this invention, people used acid, a metal rod, and scissors to shape and trim nails. In 1892, Dr. Sitts' niece invented a nail-care line for women of any social class, eventually reaching United States salons. Before then, women had short, almond-shaped nails and often used oils for additional shine or tint. Not long after, in 1907, the first liquid nail polish was invented, although it was colorless. Soon after that, it was available in a variety of different colors.

In 1925, the lunar manicure (today known as the half-moon manicure) was seen everywhere. Reds and pinks were used on the nail bed while avoiding the area around the cuticles. Then again in the 1970s, the natural look was back in fashion and preferred by many women, but only for a short time. The French manicure style was created in Paris in 1976 by Jeff Pink, the founder of the Los Angeles-based cosmetic company ORLY. Nail painting came back in vogue in the 1980s and has been extremely popular since then.

== Shapes ==
A nail shape can change the entire look of the hand and nail art, making the careful consideration of all nail types critical.

=== Almond/oval nails ===
Nails that end in a rounded point, making the fingers appear longer.

=== Stiletto/pointed ===
Similar almond nails, but sharper near the point. These work best on thinner hands and fingers, but can be more brittle.

=== Square ===
Square: A straight, square shape at the bottom.

=== Coffin/ballerina ===
Very similar to the square shape, but with tapered edges

=== Squoval ===
Similar to square, but with rounded corners. This shape is less breakable because of its rounded corners.

=== Rounded ===
Rounded at the end of the nail.

=== Duck/flare nails ===
An abstract nail shape which is square at the base of the nail and flared at the tip.

== Types ==
Types of nail art are used to create designs ranging from simple to elaborate.

=== Traditional nail polish ===
The most common type of nail art involves the use of traditional nail polish. This method is easy to apply and remove, and relatively inexpensive, although it lacks the durability of some other forms and can chip easily.

=== Acrylic nails ===
Acrylic nails are created using a mixture of acrylic powder and liquid monomer. They provide a more durable and complex design option compared to traditional nail polish, but are also more difficult to apply and remove, and can be more expensive.

=== Press-on nails ===
Press-on nails can be bought with almost any base color or design, providing an easier application process for beginners. They are safer than gel or acrylic for people with brittle nails, acting as a protective shield to promote new growth.

=== Gel nails ===
Gel nails are created using a gel that is cured under UV light. They are similarly durable and complex in design to acrylic nails, but can be more costly. Application and removal processes are similar to those for acrylic nails.

=== Nail wraps ===
Nail wraps are pre-made designs applied to the nails. They provide a quick and easy method of nail art creation and come in a variety of designs. They can be applied over traditional nail polish or acrylic nails.

=== Other types ===
Other types of nail art include stamping, stenciling, and hand painting. Stamping involves the use of a special tool to transfer a design from a stamp to the nail. Stenciling uses a pre-cut stencil to create a design on the nail. Hand painting utilizes brushes or other tools to create a design on the nail.

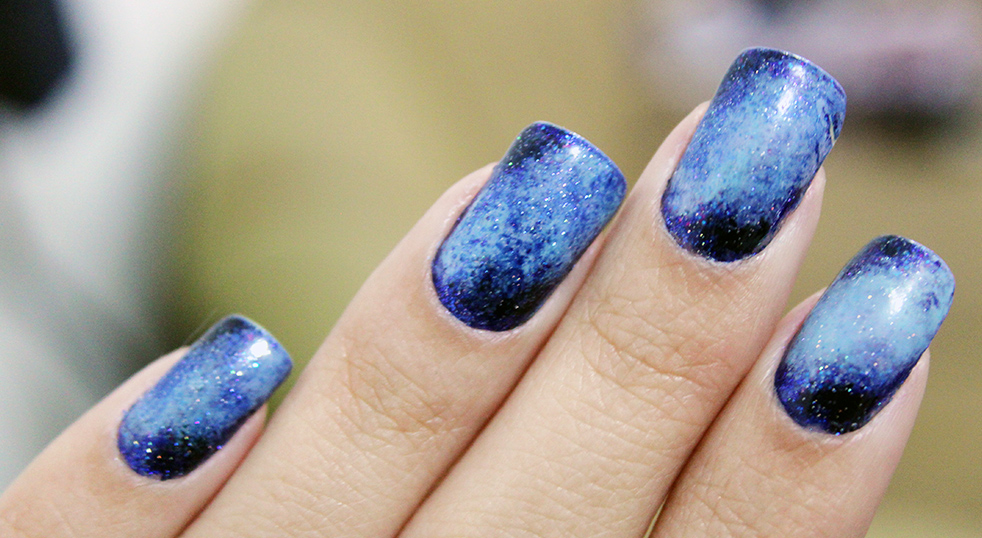
Nail art

== Social relevance ==
In some cultures, nail art can be tied to the concept of femininity and the sense of belonging in a group of females. While it is mostly women that have nail art, it is increasing in popularity among men.

Nail art is also a way to create its own identity through fashion, using colors and shapes as a disruption of childhood and entering the female teen/adult world, also leaving the influence of their parents to create their selves.

The nail is also part of the puzzle of mounting gender identity; the nails for teenagers and adult women represent a piece of the symbol of what is a woman and how the woman should present herself. Though women use nail art to express their womanliness, the different types define a woman with particular personalities, e.g. French manicure (delicate).

Clipped and filed nails, either on all ten fingers or on the index and middle finger of the dominant hand in particular, are considered a symbol of queer women after the origin of the practice as a practical measure to allow for safe digital penetration between cisgender women.

== Media ==
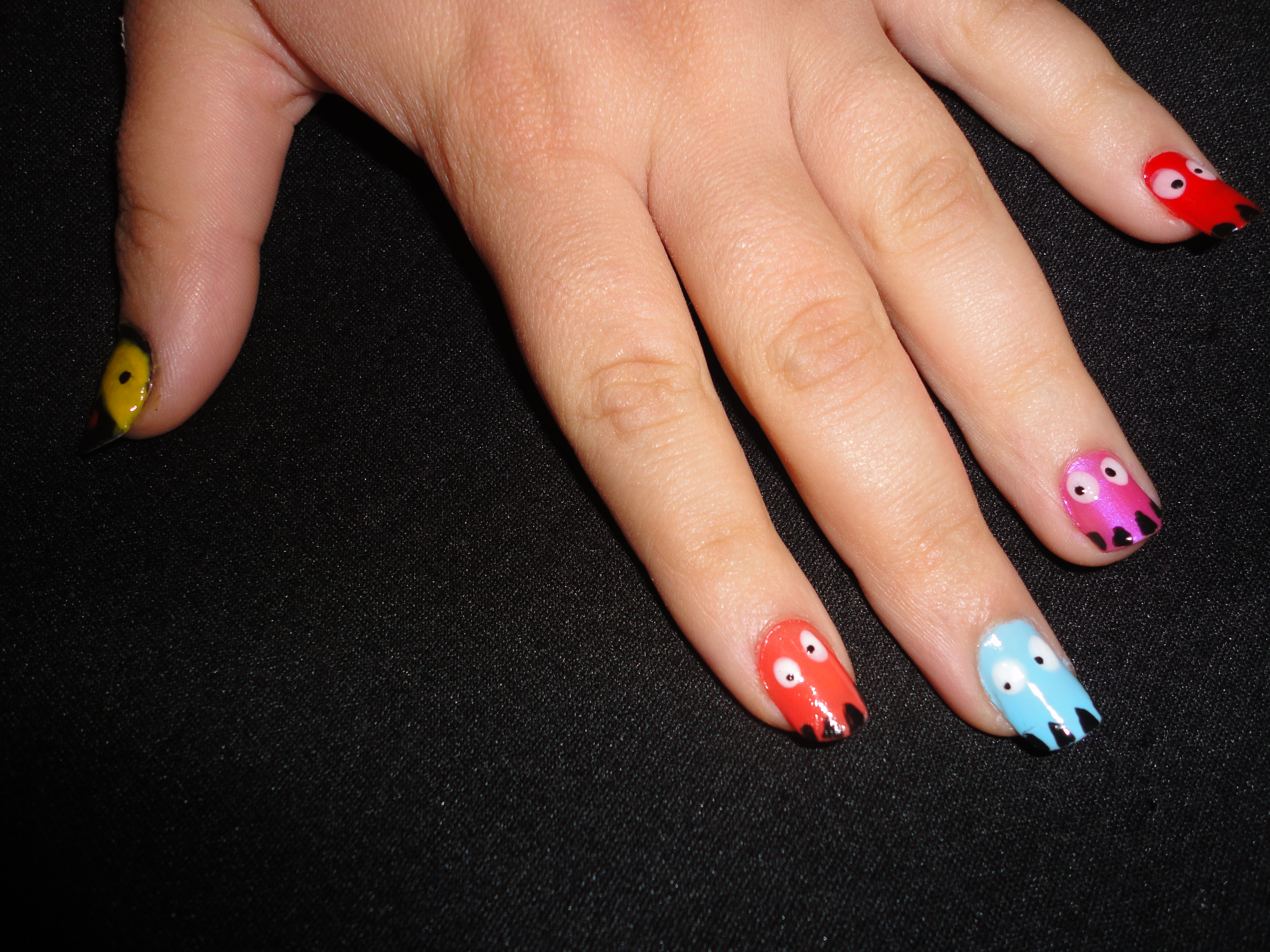
Nail art depicting characters from the video game Pac-Man

The nail-care industry has been expanding ever since the invention of modern nail polish. Nail art's popularity in media started with the printed press with women's magazines. It had an essential rollout as not a mainstream fashion trend before the 2000s. After the internet age and the everyday use of social media, the trend became prominent subculture among women.

Social media made it easier to connect to the mass audience, and with this, people started to share their designs as a way of their creativity and use the nail as their blank canvas. YouTube, Pinterest, Instagram, Tumblr, and Twitter are the major platforms which provide many new ideas and designs for the subculture. However, according to a study, Pinterest is the most critical platform for recent beauty trends. In 2012, the United States witnessed surging popularity of nail art.

== Techniques and tools ==
Manicurists start with the same techniques as for the manicure or pedicure:

- Acrylics: a chemical mixture of monomer liquid and polymer powder that can be directly applied on the nails or on artificial nails, also called nail extensions or enhancements.
- Nail gel: a chemical combination similar to acrylics, also known as shellac nails. Manicurist applies several layers on the fingernails or/and toenails and lets it cure under a UV or LED light. When the gel is fixed, it hardens the nails. The gel is also typical in a polish form known as gel polish, and, like other forms of gel, it also requires a UV or LED light to cure. The difference between acrylic and gel is that acrylic dries naturally, but gel needs UV light to cure. Similarly, where regular nail polish will dry naturally, the gel polish will remain tacky until cured by a UV light.
- Nail polish/nail varnish: a lacquer applied to finger and toenails to protect or as a base color. Nail manicurists also use a base coat to protect and strengthen nails and prevent natural nails from yellowing or staining.

Several options are available for decorating nails:

- Glitters
- 3D Charms
- Nail art pens
- Piercing
- Stamping
- Water decals
- Water marbling
- Adding accessories
  - Studs, rhinestones, plastic figurines or characters, pearls, lace, miniature plastic bowties, beads, dried flowers, and aluminum foil
- Acrylic powder for 3D art. The 3D acrylic nail art powder is a polymer powder used with a monomer liquid to create designs.

To decorate the nails, manicurists use several tools, such as:

- Nail dotters, also known as "dotting tools."
- Nail art brushes
- Stationery tape/stickers
- Thin, colored striping tape
- Sponges (for gradient effects)

Do-it-yourself (DIY) is a new concept of doing nail art without the aid of experts or professionals. One way to do a DIY design is by using home tools such as toothpicks, earbuds, cellophane tape, etc., or toolsets with dotted tools, brushes, and nail-art pens. As nail art has evolved, nail artists use acrylic powder to match clients' skin tones when doing specific techniques (Baran, 168).

=== Innovations ===
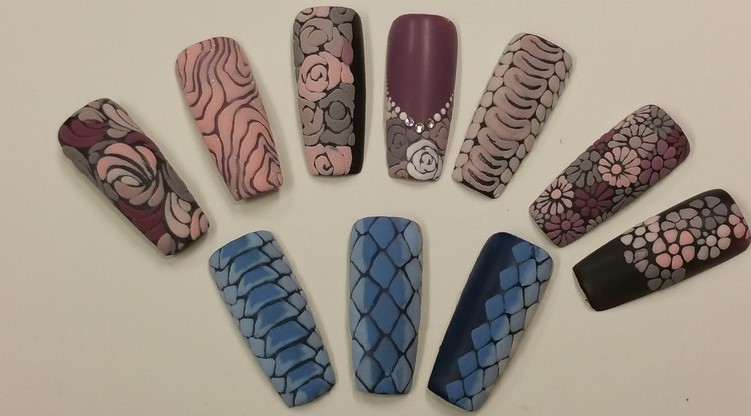
Velvet or sugar nails

Some brands try to innovate by creating new kinds of nail polish.

- Textures: microbeads or caviar beads are applied just before the nail polish becomes dry. These textures give a sand-like texture to the nail.
- Holographic effect: When exposed to light, polishes with holographic finishes give off flashy rainbow reflections. Any color or design can be enhanced using a holographic coat.

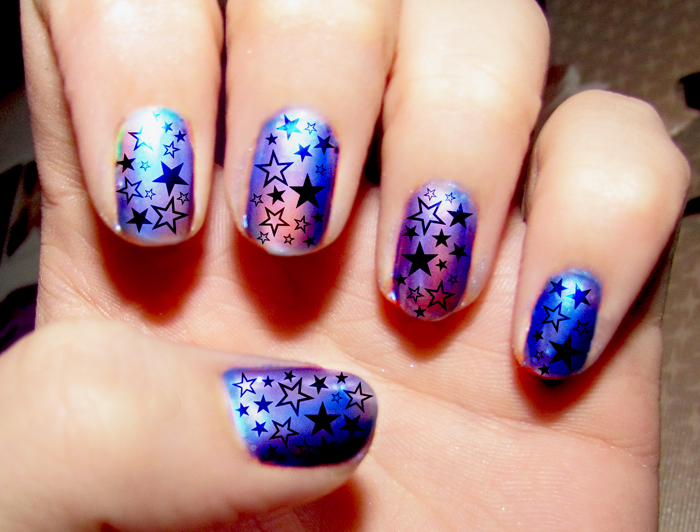
Multi-chrome nail art with star-shaped nail vinyl stencils

- Velvet manicure: Velvet fibers called velveteen are sprinkled onto wet polish. The excess is gently brushed off, leaving behind a fuzzy velvet feel.
- Crackle effect: Nail polish pioneer Sally Hansen created the first "crackle" effect polish. Acting as an overcoat, a crackle polish is applied onto already-painted nails and dries to a shattered or cracked effect.
- Thermochromic polish: When exposed to hot or cold temperatures, nail polish changes color.
- Matte effect: These nail polishes can transform a layer of glossy nail polish into a flat matte finish.
- Inverse French: Also called a "half-moon." The half-moon is created on the root nail's root in one color while the other is painted differently.
- Nail stickers: A form of artificial nails, there is an extensive range of nail stickers, strips, and wraps on the market used to mimic nail polish.
- Cat eye: Cat eye nails are meant to replicate the slit in a cats eye, hence the name. Cat eye gel polish contains magnetically responsive reflective particles suspended in the uncured coating. A magnetic field changes their orientation or position to form a bright band or other pattern, while curing immobilizes the arrangement.
- Y2k: Inspired by the style of the early 2000s, these nails usually include animal prints, vibrant colors, geometric shapes, and metallic details.
- Animal print: The most common nail animal prints include Zebra, cheetah, tiger, crocodile/alligator, cow, snake, tortoise shell, and leopard print.
- Junk nails: A Maximalist trend including a large amount of charms, vibrant colors, and designs.
- Iridescent nails: A shiny, glittery, opalescent, or metallic nail polish, with shifting colors when exposed to light.
- Water marble: These marbles are created by placing drops of nail polish into water and manipulating the shape of the polish drops to achieve the desired appearance. The nail is then dipped into the polish, adhering to the nail. You can also create this effect by swirling wet nail polish on the nail using a stylus.
- Chrome finish: A metallic powder that is rubbed onto the nail, creating a chrome finish.
- Ombre/Gradient: The blend of one color to another, usually created with an airbrush or sponge.
- Lace nails: Patterns that resemble a lace pattern.

== Notable nail artists ==
- Bernadette Thompson
- Jenny Bui
- Simply Nailogical
