= Rani Spas =

- Company type: Private
- Genre: Ayurvedic Spa, Retail Product Company, and Global Skincare
- Founded: New York City, U.S. (1994)
- Founder: Rani Thukral & Anuj Rani Thukral
- Headquarters: New York City, United States
- Number of locations: 17
- Area served: North America
- Products: Bath, Hair, Body and Skincare
- Services: Laser, Skin Treatment, Massage, Body treatment, Manicure, Pedicure, Thr'Motion and Hygiene Waxing
- Number of employees: 100+
- Parent: Anuj Rani, LLC.
- Website: www.RaniSpa.com & www.threadinginmotion.com

Rani Spas is a multi-channel Ayurvedic spa and retail product company founded in 1994 and headquartered in Manhattan, New York. The company retails its own line of bath, hair, body, and skincare products through its online catalog and local spa stores.

== History ==
Rani Spas was founded in 1994 by Rani Thukral and her son Anuj Rani Thukral. Rani's 20 different products are made from natural ingredients and are created under the influence of Ayurveda, a system of Indian traditional medicine. The spa currently has over 18 locations in New York & California.

== Awards ==
Rani Spas are recipients of the Stevie Awards for women in business, the AWIB Entrepreneurial Award, and the Saea business award from Sony.
