= Park Eun-kyung =

Park Eun-kyung may refer:

- Park Eun-kyung (field hockey) (born 1975), South Korean field hockey player
- Park Eun-kyung (born 1976), South Korean announcer of SBS
- Park Eun-kyung (gymnast) (born 1991), South Korean artistic gymnast
- Park Eun-kyung (nail artist), South Korean nail artist
