= Water transfer =

Water transfer may refer to:

- Water transportation
  - Water pipes, they are pipes that hold water and transfer it
  - Aqueduct (water supply), a water supply or navigable channel (conduit) constructed to convey water
  - Interbasin transfer
- Water flow

== See also ==
- Water transfer printing
- cf. Water transport
