= Water transfer printing =

Method of applying printed designs to three-dimensional surfaces

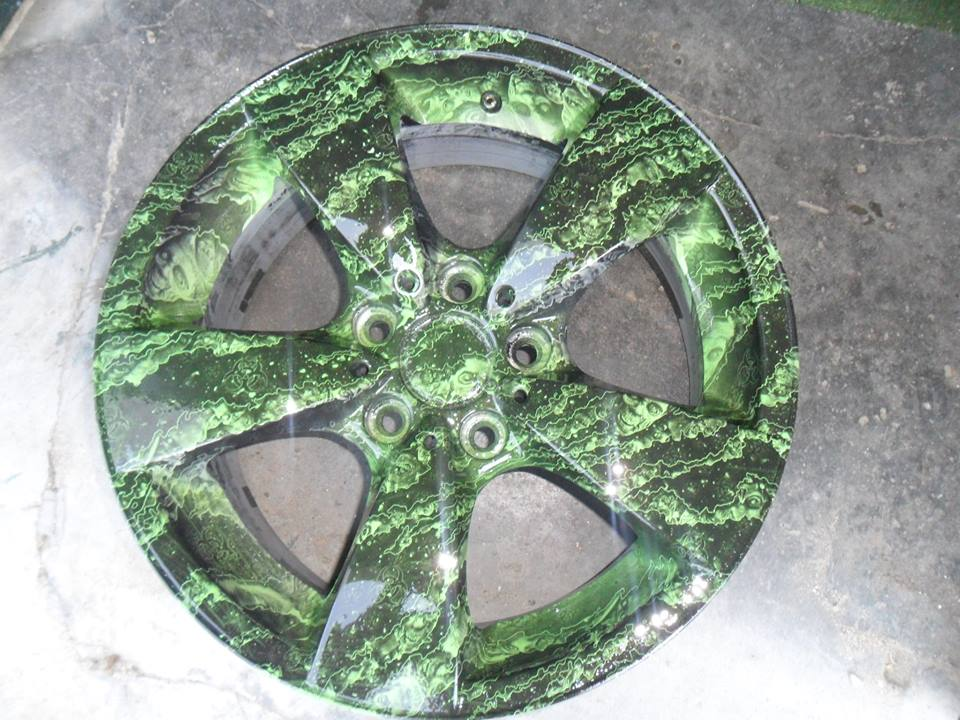
A hydro dipped automotive wheel rim

Water transfer printing, also known as immersion printing, water transfer imaging, hydro dipping, watermarbling, cubic printing, Hydrographics, or HydroGraphics, is a method of applying printed designs to three-dimensional surfaces. The resulting combinations may be considered decorative art or applied art. The hydrographic process can be used on metal, plastic, glass, hard woods, and various other materials.

== History ==
The exact origin of the water transfer printing process is unclear, though it shares some basic qualities with the traditional Japanese paper marbling method, suminagashi. However, the first hydrographic apparatus registered for a US patent was by Motoyasu Nakanishi of Cubic Engineering KK on July 26, 1982. Its abstract reads, "[a] printing apparatus provided with a structure which supplies a transcription film into a transcription tub containing a liquid so that the transcription film is kept afloat on the liquid, a structure which makes the liquid flow in a direction in which the film is supplied, and a structure which slantingly immerses an article to be printed into the liquid in the transcription tub from an upstream position to a downstream position of the liquid." An earlier Japanese claim for the invention of "cubic printing" was made by the company Taica in August 1974.

== Usage ==
The water transfer printing process is extensively used to decorate items that range from entire all-terrain vehicles and car dashboards, to small items like bike helmets or other automotive trim. Films can be applied to all types of substrates including plastic, fiberglass, wood, ceramics, and metal. For the most part, if the item can be dipped in water and can be painted using traditional techniques then the hydrographic printing process can be used.

== Process ==
In the process, the substrate piece to be printed first goes through the entire painting process: surface preparation, priming, painting, and clear coating. Depending on some types of plastics, some substrates may also need to be flame treated before a base coat is applied. A PVA hydrographic film, which has been printed on with a desired graphic image using latex or pigment-based inks, is carefully placed on the water's surface in the dipping tank. Recommended water temperature for the dip tank is 90°F (32°C). The clear hydrographic film is water-soluble and should dwell on top of the water for 60-75 seconds. Safely using a fitted respirator, the film is then sprayed with an activator solution to dissolve the film and return it to its fluid state. Once dipping is begun, the surface tension of the water will allow the pattern to curve around any shape. Any remaining residue is then rinsed off thoroughly. The ink adheres to the desired surface and it cannot be washed off easily. It is then allowed to dry.

The adhesion is a result of the chemical components of the activator softening the base coat layer and allowing the ink to form a bond with it. One of the most common causes of a failure to achieve adhesion between the two layers is a poorly applied activator. This can be either too much activator being applied or too little.

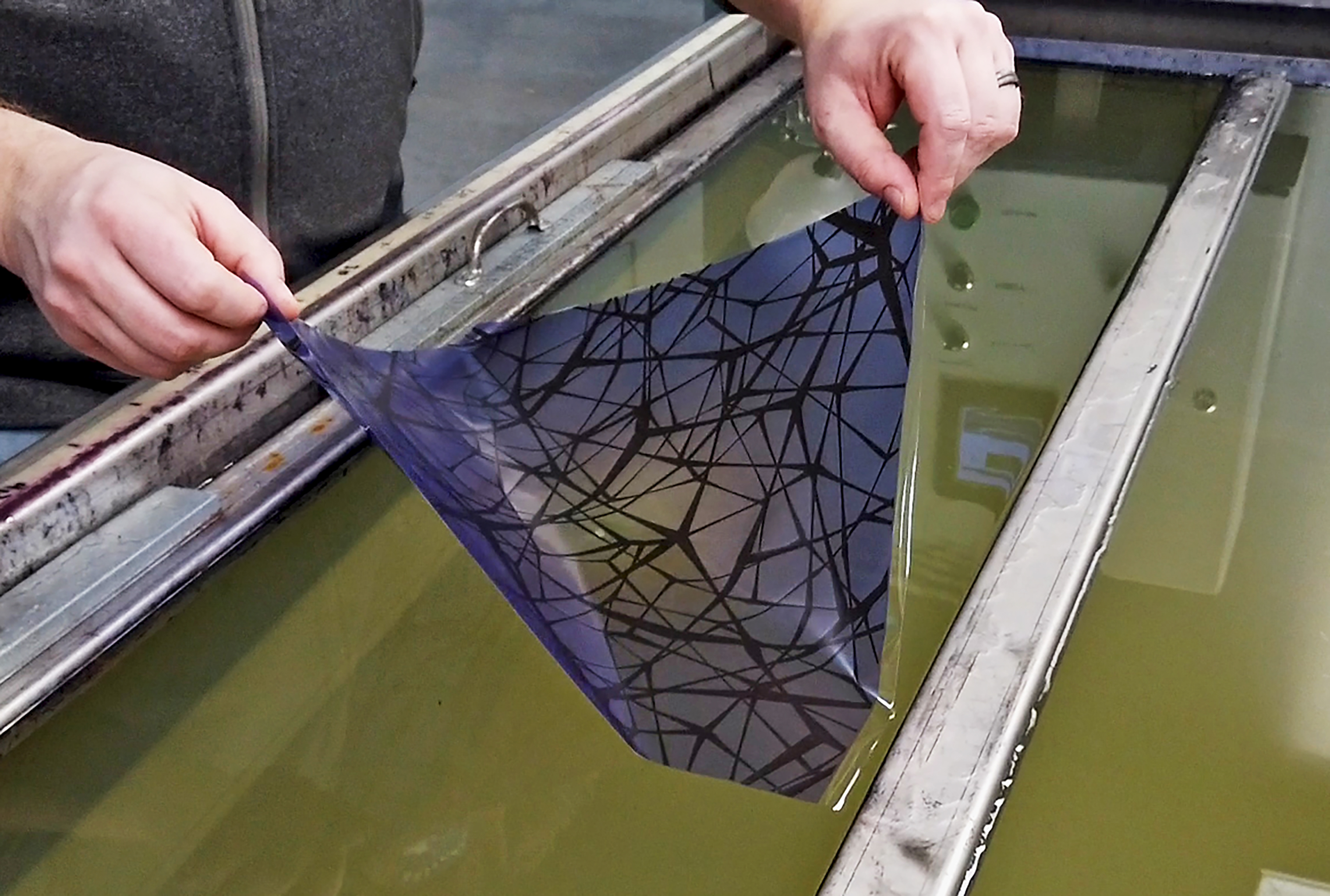
Before laying the hydrographic film on top of the water's surface, it works best to cradle the film roll one corner slowly and smoothly onto the water to the other corner. Avoid getting any air bubbles under the film.

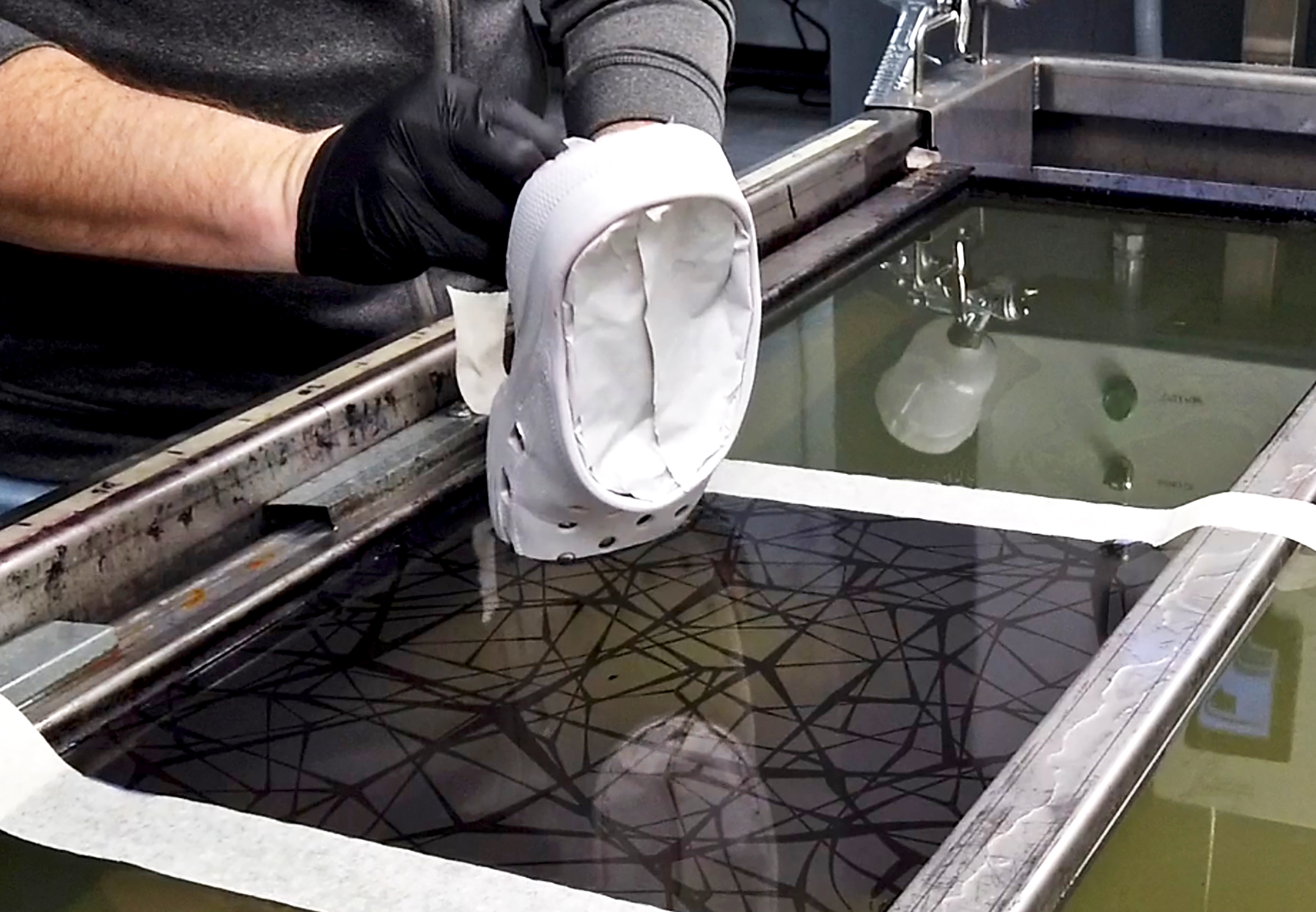
A substrate should typically be dipped at about a 45° angle.

== See also ==
- Paper marbling
- Water marble nail
