= Bernadette Thompson =

American celebrity manicurist and nail artist

- Born: 1969 (age 56–57); Yonkers, New York USA
- Years active: 1993-present
- Known for: Nail art pioneer
- Notable work: "Money Nails" collaboration with Lil' Kim, later exhibited in Museum of Modern Art
- Website: bernadettethompson.com

Bernadette Thompson (born 1969) is an American celebrity manicurist and nail artist known for her innovative designs and collaborations with prominent figures across the music, fashion, and entertainment industries. Since the mid-1990s, she has worked with a diverse array of celebrities, including Madonna, Mary J. Blige, Kim Kardashian, Missy Elliott, Sarah Jessica Parker, Alicia Keys, Luther Vandross, Aaliyah, Beyoncé, Lupita Nyong'o, Jennifer Lopez and Lady Gaga. Thompson's work has been featured in major fashion magazines such as Vogue, Harper's BAZAAR, Allure, and Essence. She gained widespread recognition for creating the "money nails" design for Lil' Kim in 1999, which involved embedding real currency into acrylic nails and later became a part of the Museum of Modern Art's collection, the first nail art to ever be included. Beyond her celebrity collaborations, Thompson has worked with fashion designers like Marc Jacobs, Calvin Klein, and Louis Vuitton, contributing to editorial campaigns and runway shows. Her work has influenced both street style and high fashion, playing a role in bringing creative nail art into mainstream acceptance.

== Early life and education ==
Thompson was born in 1969 in Yonkers, New York. During her upbringing, she casually styled hair and nails for friends, fostering an early interest in beauty and cosmetology. In 1993, she attended nail school part-time to formalize her skills. Shortly after, she opened her first salon in Yonkers.

== Career ==
=== Early career and breakthrough ===
Thompson operated her salon for approximately six months before receiving an opportunity to work with Hip Hop and R&B artist Mary J. Blige. The connection was facilitated through Mary's sister, LaTonya, who had recently had her nails done by Thompson. Blige admired LaTonya's nails and was surprised to learn they were done by Thompson, whom she knew from their shared upbringing. Blige reportedly sent a limousine to bring Thompson to collaborate with her. This encounter marked the beginning of Thompson's associations with leading artists in the music industry.

=== Collaborations with artists ===
Following her work with Mary J. Blige, Thompson began connecting with other prominent figures in the hip hop and R&B scenes. Through industry connections, including those facilitated by Sean "Puff Daddy" Combs, she worked with artists such as Missy Elliott, and Beyoncé, establishing herself as a sought-after manicurist in the entertainment sector.

=== Work in the fashion industry ===
In 1998, Thompson began collaborating with fashion brands, including a partnership with Louis Vuitton. Her entry into high fashion expanded her influence beyond music, allowing her to contribute to runway shows, editorial shoots, and campaigns. Her work bridged urban street styles with luxury fashion, reflecting a merging of cultural influences.

== "Money Nails" nail art ==
=== Creation and impact ===
In 1999, during a fashion shoot for a denim campaign featuring Lil' Kim, Thompson created the "money nails" design. Seeking to produce a distinctive and bold look, she embedded real $100 bills into acrylic nails for Lil' Kim to wear on the set. Thompson told Harper's BAZAAR, "all she had were little short nails! So I went into my wallet, took money out, cut it up, and did a French manicure." The design was inspired by Lil' Kim's appearance in the song and music video "Get Money" by Junior M.A.F.I.A. The "money nails" gained widespread attention and became emblematic of 1990s hip hop fashion, inspiring trends in nail art and popularizing elaborate nail designs in mainstream culture.

=== Treasury department inquiry ===
The use of real currency in the "money nails" design led to a phone call from the U.S. Department of the Treasury, informing Thompson that defacing currency is a federal offense. She told Elle Canada magazine that no charges were filed against her.

=== Influence on fashion and nail art ===
The popularity of the "money nails" contributed to the integration of hip hop aesthetics into the broader fashion industry. The design inspired other artists and designers to explore nail art styling, helping to bring such styles into the mainstream fashion dialogue.

=== Museum of Modern Art exhibition ===
In 2017, the Museum of Modern Art invited Thompson to recreate the "money nails" for inclusion in the exhibition "Items: Is Fashion Modern?" The design was showcased alongside iconic fashion pieces such as the little black dress, red lipstick, and Chanel No. 5 perfume. The exhibition highlighted the cultural and artistic significance of her work within the context of modern fashion history. Her work was also included in Pirouette: Turning Points in Design, a 2025 exhibition that features "widely recognized design icons [...] highlighting pivotal moments in design history."

== Legacy and public reception ==
Bernadette Thompson is considered a pioneer in nail artistry and a leader in the industry. Face2Face Africa described her as "undoubtedly the go-to consultant for many A-list artists and Hollywood stars," noting that "her name has eventually become a household brand in almost every fashion magazine." Her innovative designs and collaborations have influenced trends in both the beauty and fashion industries with Harper's BAZAAR highlighting of her work with Lil' Kim that "the result, now known as money nails, became a defining moment in the history of hip-hop and beauty. The look went viral before the internet did." According to Elle Decor, "Money nails became a trending topic on Google... From then on, women of color would take the lead in a cultural rebirth for nail art, considered an affirmation of themselves and their aesthetic in a Eurocentric world."

Thompson's work has played a role in bringing elaborate nail art into mainstream acceptance as The Washington Post remarked, "In the beginning, the nails were part of a hip-hop style, which was a separate category from what was then considered mainstream fashion... Thompson helped to change that" and declared that her "nail art scrambled our assumptions about femininity, beauty and class." Edition Magazine by Modern Luxury referred to Thompson as "the living legend behind the world's most culture-shifting nail art," noting that "the explosive popularity of modern nail art has its origins in the work Thompson started with fellow Yonkers, N.Y. native singer Mary J. Blige."

Fashion Magazine credited Thompson as being "largely responsible for nails eventually becoming a major element of fashion shoots," adding that "trailblazers in the ’90s, like Lil’ Kim, Foxy Brown and Mary J. Blige... introduced [blinged-out tips] to the mainstream. And the woman behind them all was manicurist Bernadette Thompson." Her influence has also led to manicurists receiving official credit in fashion photography, as cited by The Washington Post.

== See also ==
- Body art
- Avant-garde
