= Water marble nail =

Nail art technique

Water marble nails are a finger nail art technique involving dropping nail lacquers into clear water and creating a pattern on the water surface; the pattern is then transferred to the nails.

== History ==
The water marble nail technique was originally developed by professional nail technicians in Japanese nail salons. In the 1990s, it was popularized by commercial publications released by shopping centers in Chiba, Japan. In 2010, water marble nail art was adapted to use acrylic artificial nails and gels.

The water marble nail technique has gained popularity across the globe through features in magazines, websites, polish makers and videos.

== Styles ==
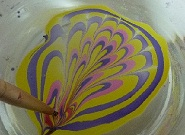
Water marble nail art method, free-dragging

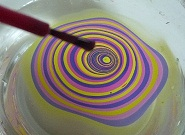
Water marble nail art method, free-dropping

There are two main types of water marble nail art methods: free-dragging and free-dropping. Free-dragging is more common.

=== Free-dragging ===
Dragged patterns range from simple circular shapes to complicated drawings. Patterns such as marble, hearts/peacocks, (Note: The pattern called "hearts" is also called "peacock", the name of a professional nail art technique. Drawing a "peacock" is one challenge to professional nail artists sponsored by the Japan Nailist Association.) animals, flowers, leaves, parallel lines, psychedelics, spiderwebs, and random patterns in the style of designer Emilio Pucci are generally performed with nail lacquers and some kind of tool.

=== Free-dropping ===
Dropped patterns range from colored shapes to complicated drawings such as spirals and geometric designs. The free patterns are created by colored drops of nail lacquer. For free-dropping, lacquer colors are dropped straight or diagonally onto the water. The pattern floats on the surface of the water.

== Technique ==
Water marble nail art requires clean water, nail lacquers for free-dropping, and a stick for drawing patterns. Before patterns are created, the nails are painted with a light-colored nail polish that establishes a good contrast with the colors chosen to create the water marble. Some techniques use a matte coat to provide contrast and maintain an even look.

After the base coat has dried, tape is put around the fingers to gather the excess nail polish after the marbling. One or two drops of colored lacquer are chosen for the design and are added to a cup of clean water. The drops will create a circle on the water surface. The next color is added on top of the circle created by the previous drop. The resulting pattern is ready for application to the nail, but it can still be modified with a stick or toothpick to create different shapes. The nail is dipped into the pattern on the water and kept under water as a Q-tip is used to "grab" the remaining polish.

== Examples ==
Examples of water marble nail art
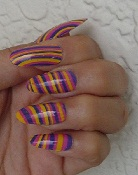
An example of decorated nails.

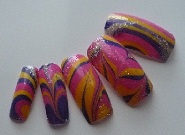
Some examples of design by free-dragging are bee, heart, leaf, flower, and earth.

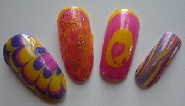
designs (peacock, marble on water, heart in frames, zebra/stripes) created by some of the methods

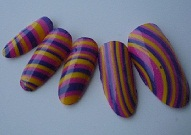
An example of a design by free-dropping is this spiral/lines.

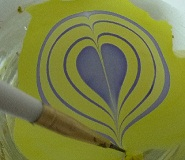
An example beginning of free-dragging.

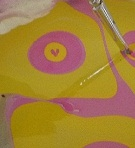
A step in the water marbling method.

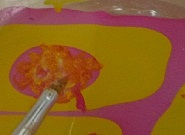
A step in the water marbling method.

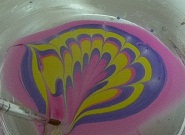
A step in the water marbling method.
