= Manicure =

Cosmetic beauty treatment for hands and fingernails

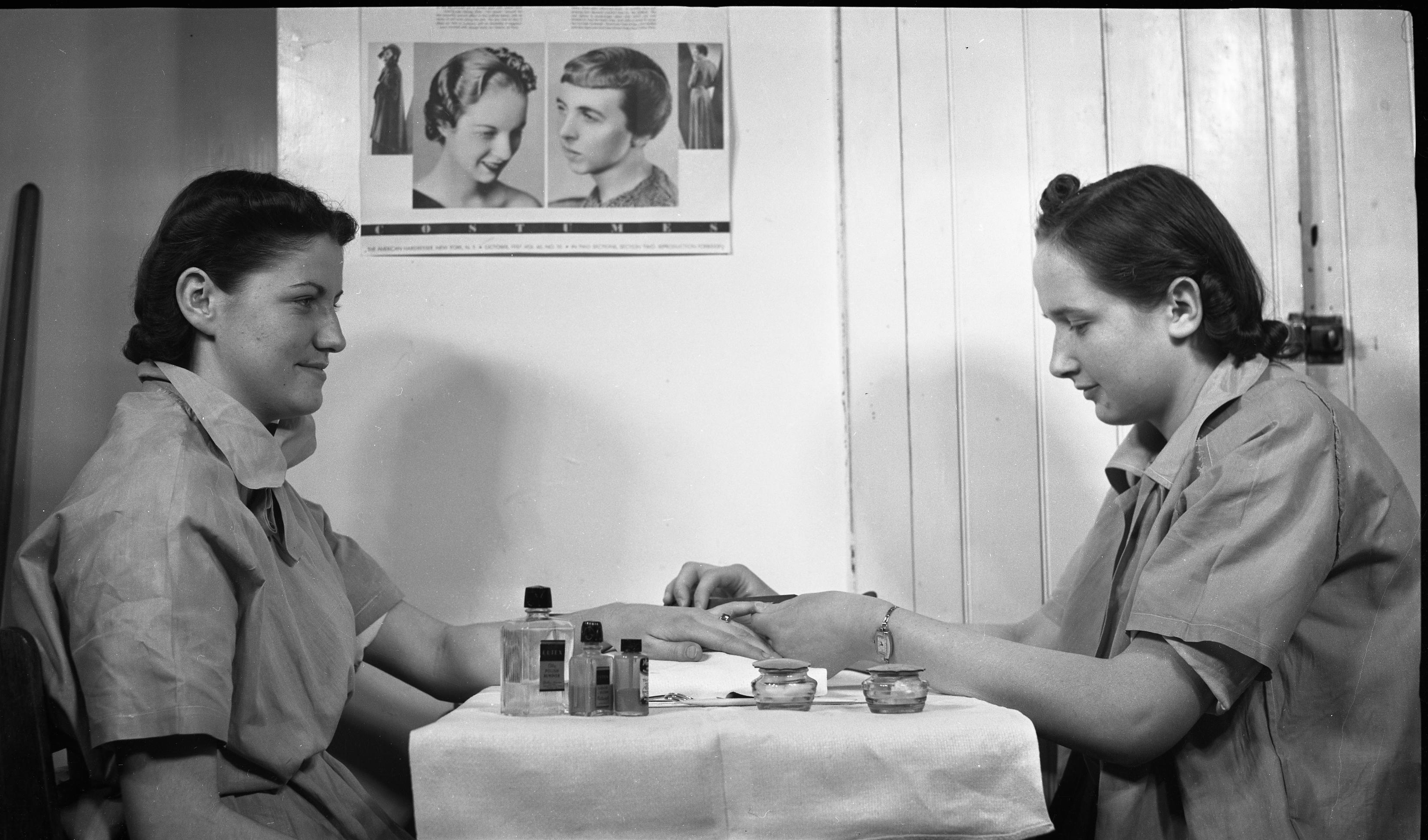
A woman giving another woman a manicure. Belleville, Ontario, 1930s.

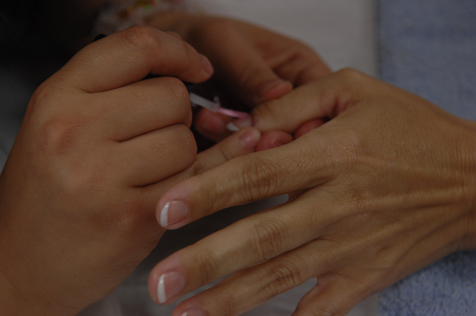
Manicure closeup –clear nail polish being applied

A manicure is a mostly cosmetic beauty treatment for the fingernails and hands performed at home or in a nail salon. A manicure usually consists of filing and shaping the free edge of nails, pushing and clipping (with a cuticle pusher and cuticle nippers) any nonliving tissue at the cuticle and removing hangnails, treatments with various liquids, massage of the hand, and the application of fingernail polish. When the same is applied to the toenails and feet, the treatment is referred to as a pedicure. Together, the treatments may be known as a mani-pedi.

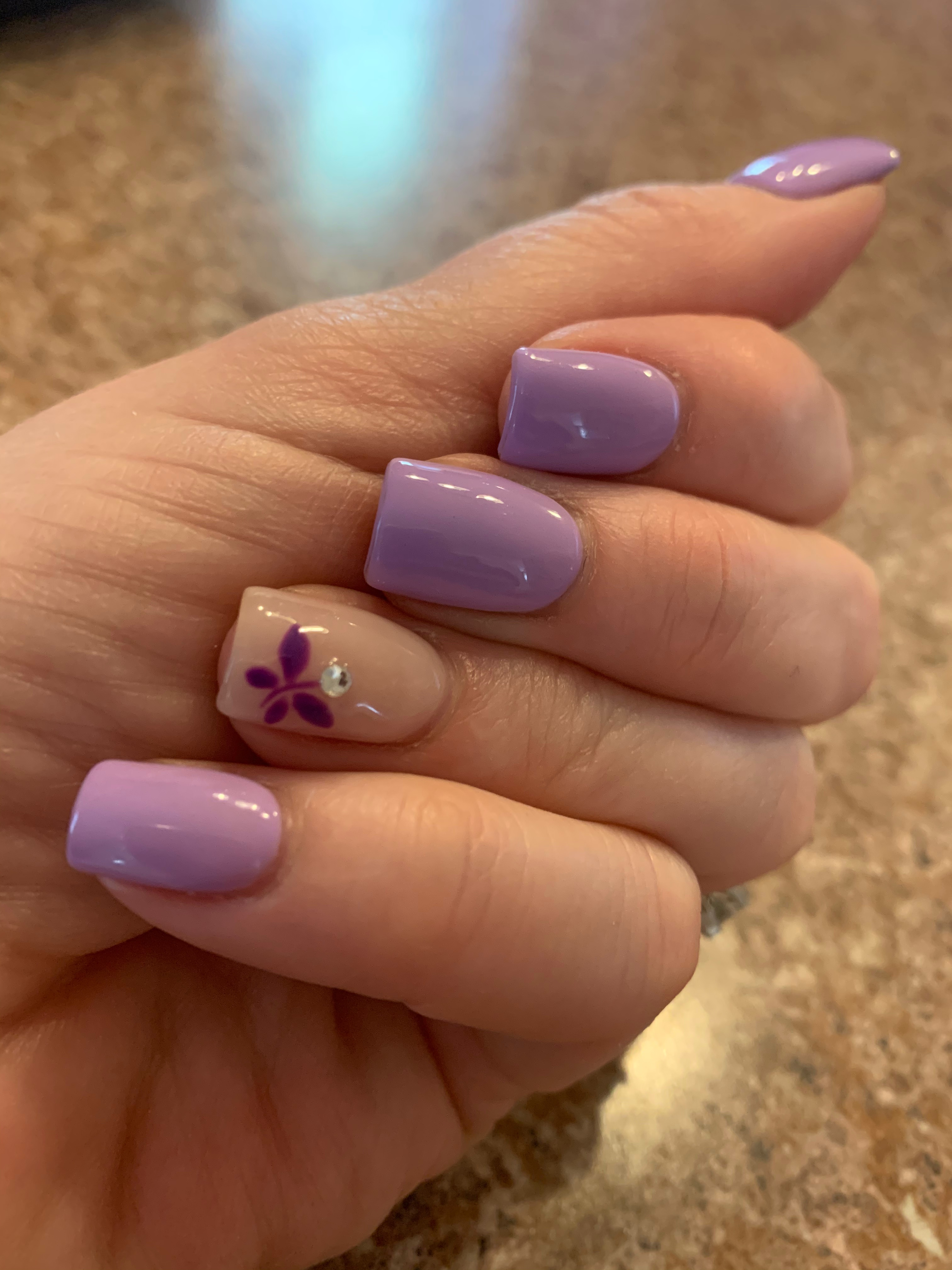
Acrylic manicure with jewel design

Some manicures include painting pictures or designs on the nails, applying small decals, or imitation jewels (from 2 dimensions to 3 dimensions). Other nail treatments may include the application of artificial gel nails, tips, or acrylics.

Nail technicians, such as manicurists and pedicurists, must be licensed in certain states and countries, and must follow government regulations. Since the skin is manipulated and often times trimmed, there is a risk of spreading infection when tools are used across many people. Therefore, having improper sanitation can pose serious issues.

== Etymology ==
The English word manicure comes from the French word manucure, meaning care of the hands, which in turn originates from the Latin words manus, for hand, and cura, for care. Similarly, the English word pedicure comes from the Latin words pes (genitive case: pedis), for foot, and cura, for care. Colloquially, the word for manicure is sometimes shortened to mani.

== Types ==
=== Dip powder manicures ===
Dip powder manicures are an alternative to traditional acrylic nails and gel polish. Dip powders have become popular due to ease of application. They are similar to traditional silk or fiberglass enhancements, with the fiber being replaced by acrylic powder. Both methods rely on layering cyanoacrylate over the natural nail and encasing either the fiber or acrylic powder. While a single layer of fiber is typical, multiple alternating layers of powder and cyanoacrylate may be used in dip nails.

=== French manicures ===
Jeff Pink, founder of the professional nail brand ORLY, is credited with creating the natural nail look later called the French manicure in 1976.

In the mid-1970s, Pink was tasked by a film director to come up with a universal nail look that would save screen actresses from having to spend time getting their nails redone to go along with their costume changes. Inspired by the instant brightening effect of a white pencil applied to the underside, Pink suspected that the solution was to apply that same neutralizing principle to the top of the nail. "I got one gallon of white polish for the tips, and pink, beige, or rose for the nail," he recalled in a 2014 interview with The National. The Natural Nail Kit, as Pink called it then, was a hit among movie stars and studios who found the time-saving strategy indispensable. "The director commented that I should get an Oscar for saving the industry so much money," he said. Eventually Pink took the trend to the catwalk crowd in Paris, and they liked it, too. But, it still needed, as he thought, a more pleasing name. He gave it the French rebranding on the flight back home to Los Angeles.

Nails that have undergone a French manicure are characterized by a lack of artificial base color and white tips at the free edge of the nail. For this reason, they are sometimes referred to as French tips. The nail tips are painted white, while the rest of the nails are polished in a pink or a suitable nude shade. French manicures can be achieved with artificial nails. However, it is also as common to perform a French manicure on natural nails. Another technique is to whiten the underside of the nail with white pencil and paint a sheer color over the entire nail.

=== Hot oil manicures ===
A hot oil manicure is a specific type of manicure that cleans the cuticles and softens them with oil. Types of oils that can be used are mineral oil, olive oil, some lotions or commercial preparations in an electric heater.

=== Lesbian manicures ===
A lesbian manicure (also known as a queer manicure, lez nails, or femmicure, from the LGBTQ slang terms queer, lez, and femme respectively) is a style or trend of manicure intended to allow lesbians and other queer people in the LGBTQ community to safely and easily perform digital penetration during sex. The most distinct and modern form of the manicure entails long nail extensions on every finger apart from the index finger, middle finger, and sometimes thumb of the dominant hand, thus preventing injury or discomfort to the vulva or vagina during intercourse while otherwise maintaining the fashion of long acrylic nails in one's daily life. The style is often seen as a public expression or symbol of lesbian identity, particularly on the femme side of the femme-butch spectrum.

== Paraffin wax treatments ==
Hands or feet can be covered in melted paraffin wax for softening and moisturizing. Paraffin wax is used because it can be heated to temperatures of over 95 °F (35 °C) without burning or injuring the body. The intense heat allows for deeper absorption of emollients and essential oils. The wax is usually infused with various botanical ingredients such as aloe vera, azulene, chamomile, or tea tree oil, and fruit waxes such as apple, peach, and strawberry, are often used in salons. Paraffin wax treatments are often charged as an addition to the standard manicure or pedicure. They are often not covered in general training and are a rare treatment in most nail salons.

Professional services should not include dipping clients' hands or feet into a communal paraffin bath, as the wax can be a vector for disease. Paraffin should be applied in a way that avoids contamination, often by placing a portion of the wax into a bag or mitt, which is placed on the client's hand or foot and covered with a warm towel, cotton mitt, or booty to retain warmth. The paraffin is left for a few minutes until it has cooled.

== Common manicure tools and supplies ==
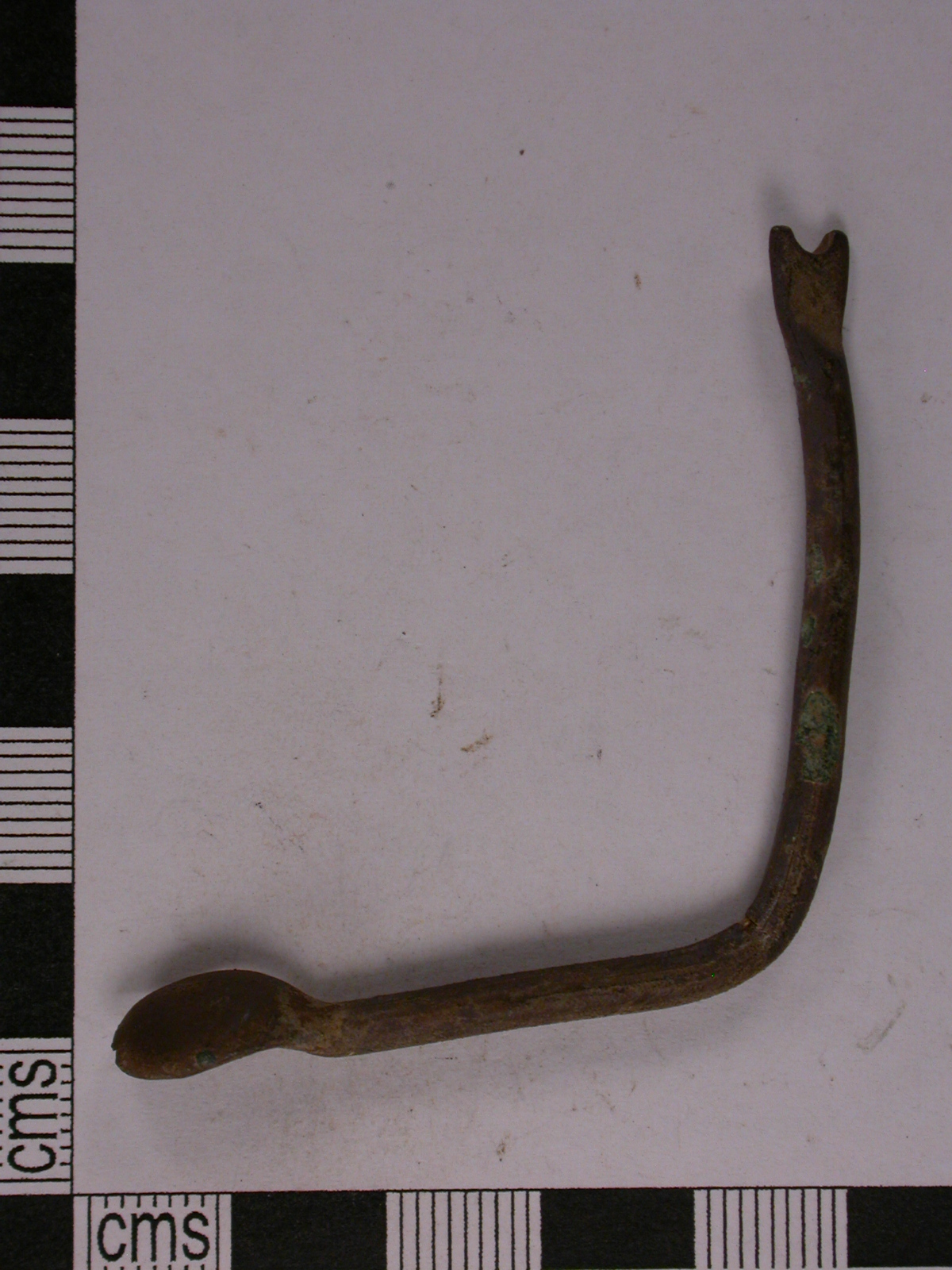
Cast copper alloy Roman toiletry implement, with an oval spoon bowl at one end, and a pointed bifid terminal at the other end, used as a nail cleaner

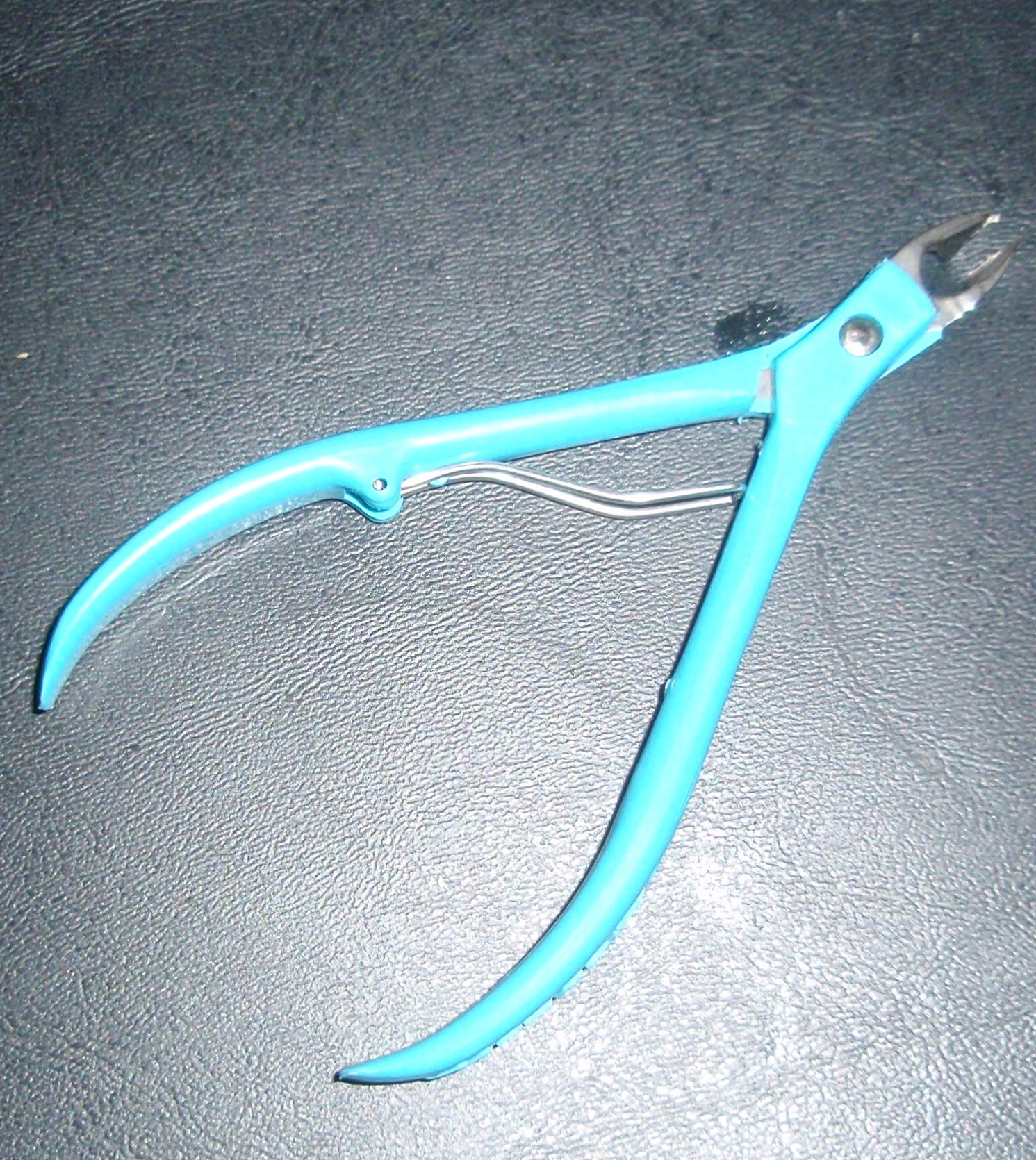
A standard cuticle nipper used during manicure

Common manicure/pedicure tools include:

- Bowl of warm water or fingerbath
- Cuticle nipper (cuticle knife, cuticle clipper)
- Cuticle pusher
- Foot bath (pedicures)
- Manicure table
- Nail art brushes/tools
- Nail brush
- Nail buffer
- Nail clippers
- Nail file (usually an emery board)
- Nail scissors
- Orangewood stick
- Pumice stone / foot file (pedicures)
- Rubber thimble (used to help open polish)
- Toe separator (pedicures)

Common manicure/pedicure supplies include:

- Cotton balls/pads
- Cuticle remover
- Hand cream
- Hand towels
- Massage lotion
- Mild scrub
- Nail jewels (often self-adhesive)
- Nail polish
- Nail polish remover or nail polish remover wipes
  - Base coat polish and ridge filler polish
  - Color varnish
  - Top coat or sealant

For decoration:

- Fimo/Nail art cane slices
- Flocking Powder
- Glitter
- Sanitizing spray/towels
- Small dried flowers

== Sanitation options ==
In Australia, the United States, and other countries, many nail salons offer personal nail tool kits for purchase to avoid some of the sanitation issues in the salon. The kits are often kept in the salon and given to the client to take home, or are thrown away after use. They are only used when that client comes in for a treatment.

Another option is to give the client the files and wooden cuticle sticks after the manicure. Since the 1970s, the overwhelming majority of professional salons use electric nail files that are faster and yield higher quality results, particularly with acrylic nail enhancements.

== Shape ==
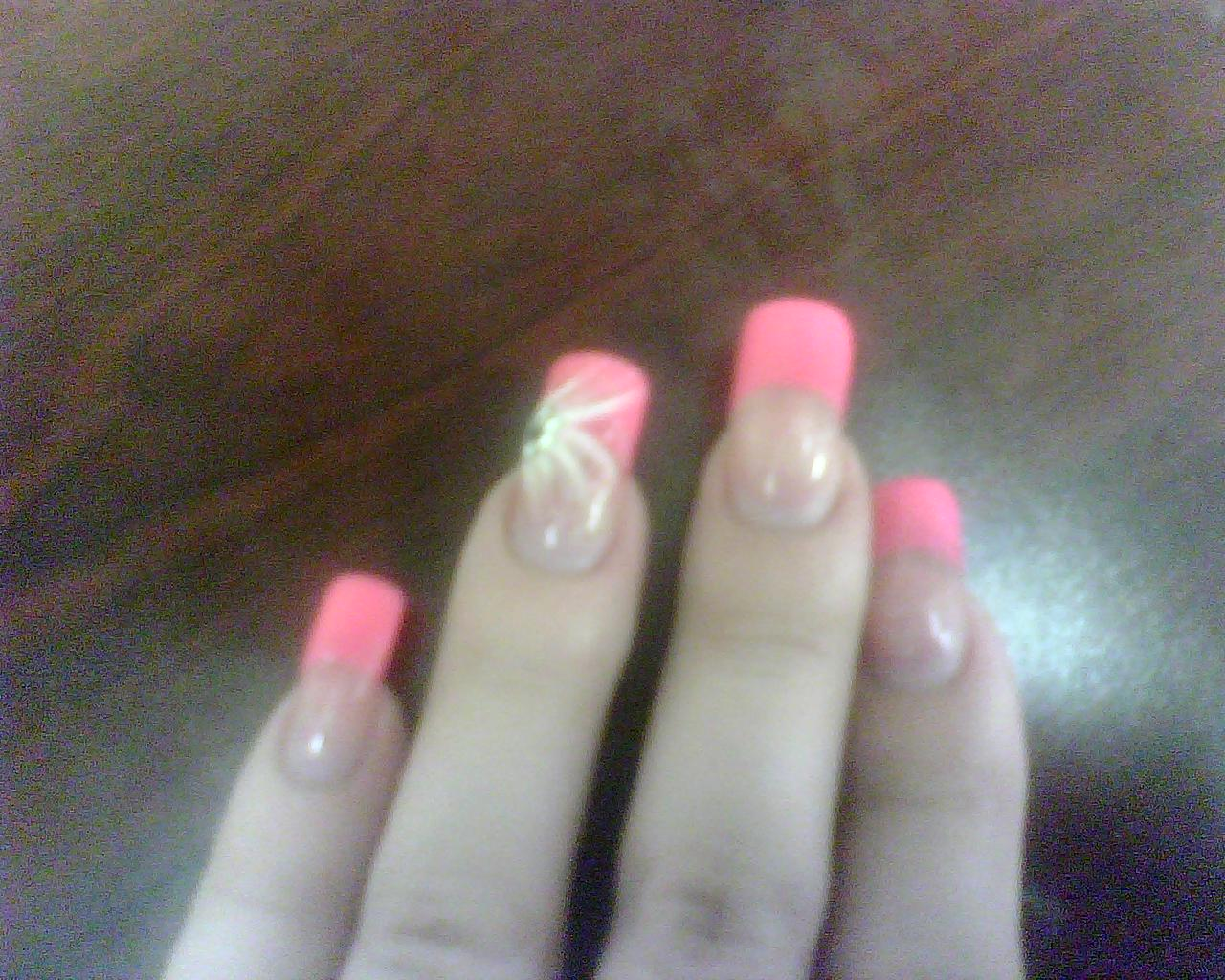
Fingernails in the shape of "squovals"

There are several common nail shapes: almond, oval, pointed, round, square, square oval, square with rounded corners, and straight with a rounded tip.

The square oval shape is sometimes known as squoval, a term coined in 1984. The squoval is considered a sturdy shape.

== Gallery ==
Paintings
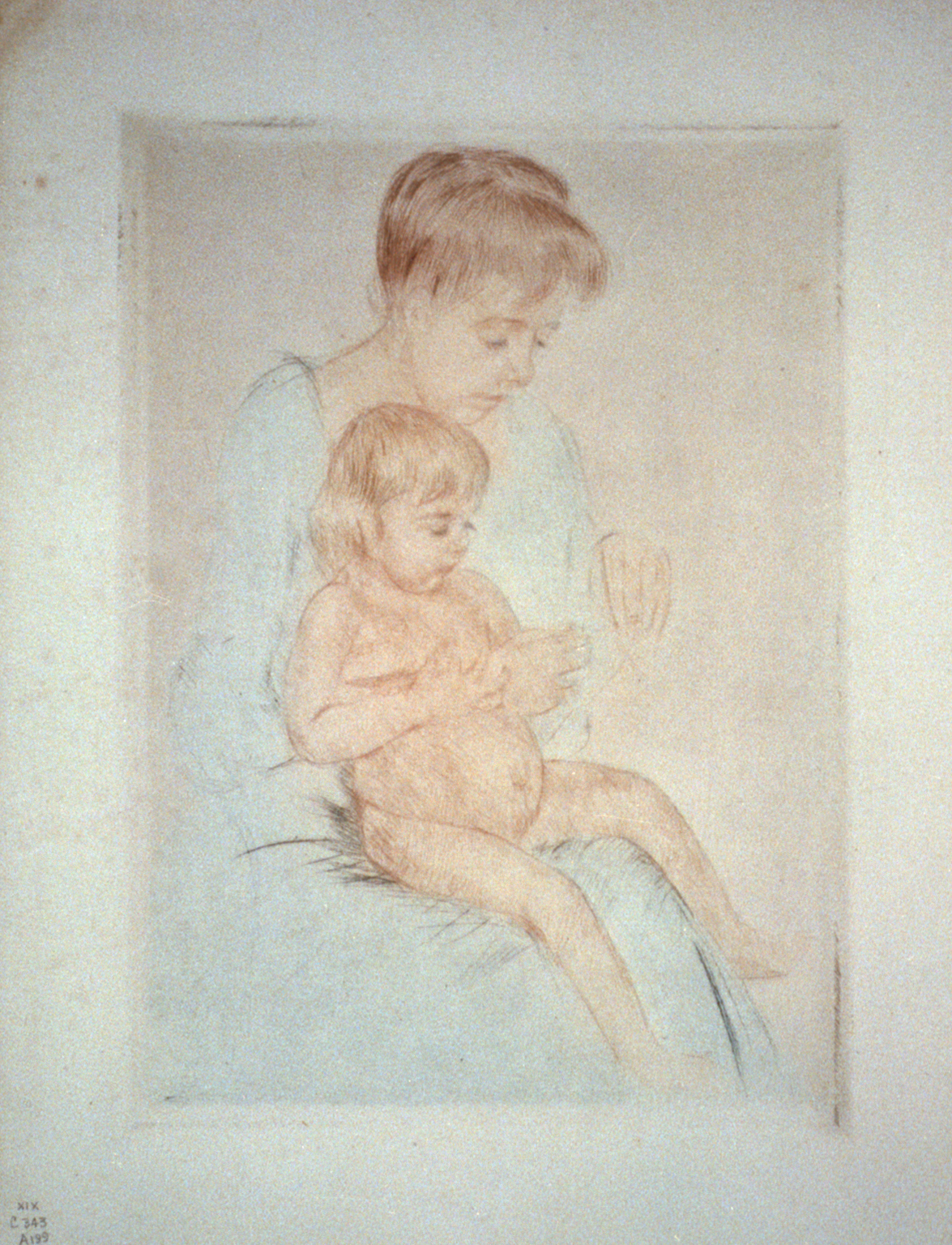
The manicure, painting by Mary Cassatt

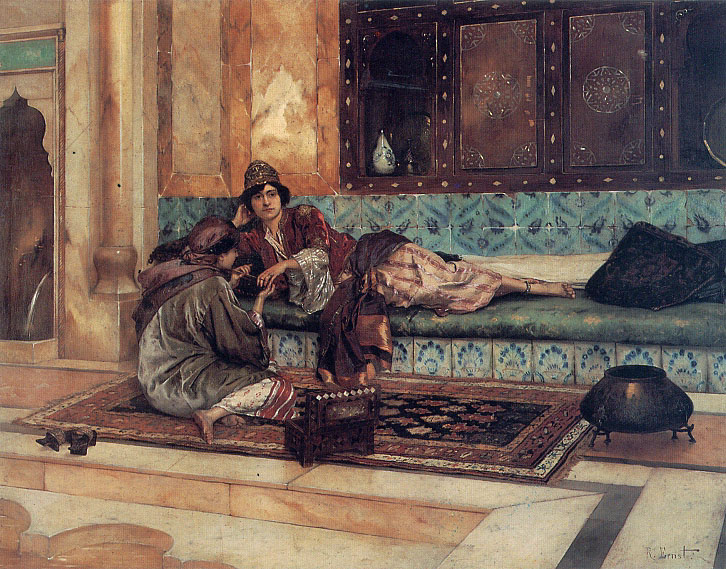
The Manicure, painting by Rudolf Ernst

== Notable manicurists ==
- Park Eun-kyung
- Deborah Lippmann
- Bernadette Thompson
- Marian Newman
- Mary E. Cobb
