= Jenny Bui =

Cambodian-American nail artist

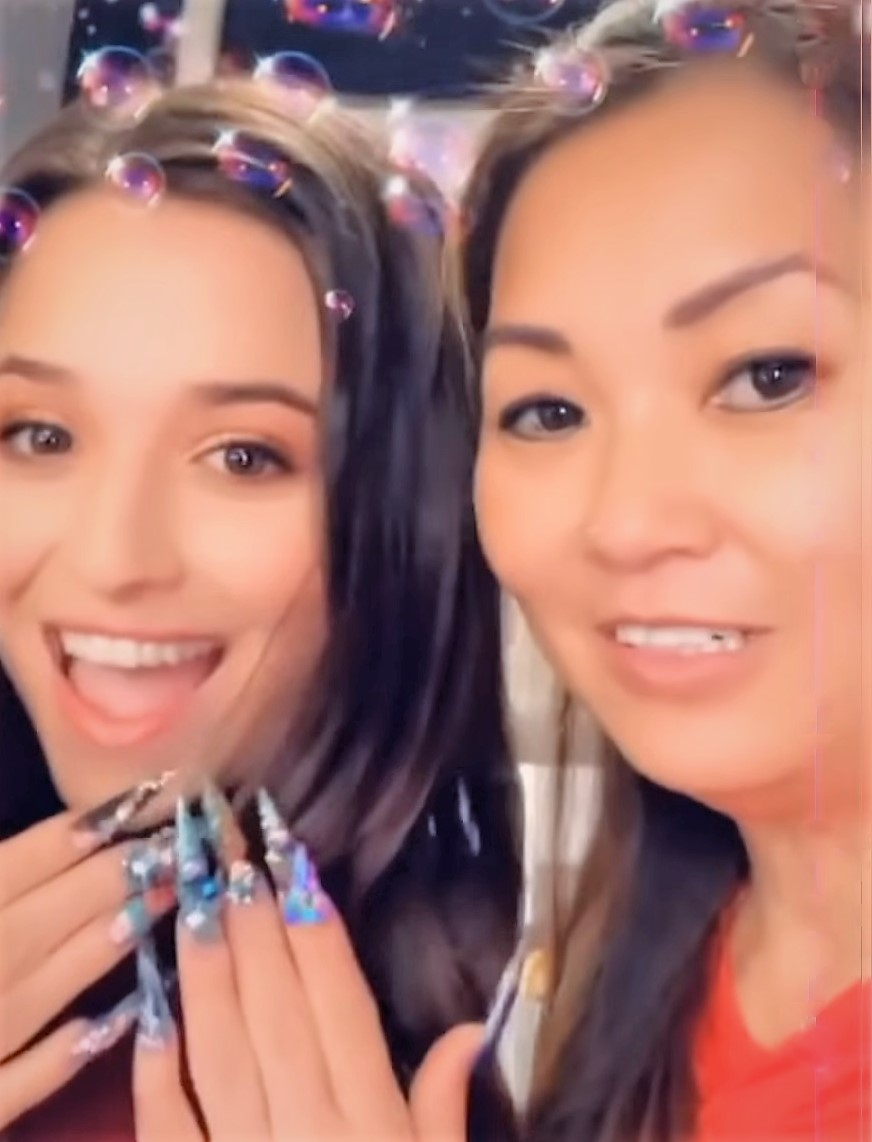
Bui (right) with a client in 2020

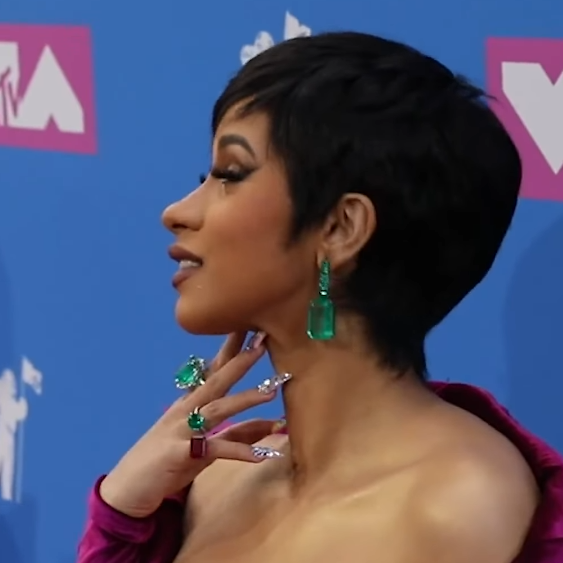
Cardi B showing off her Jenny Bui nails

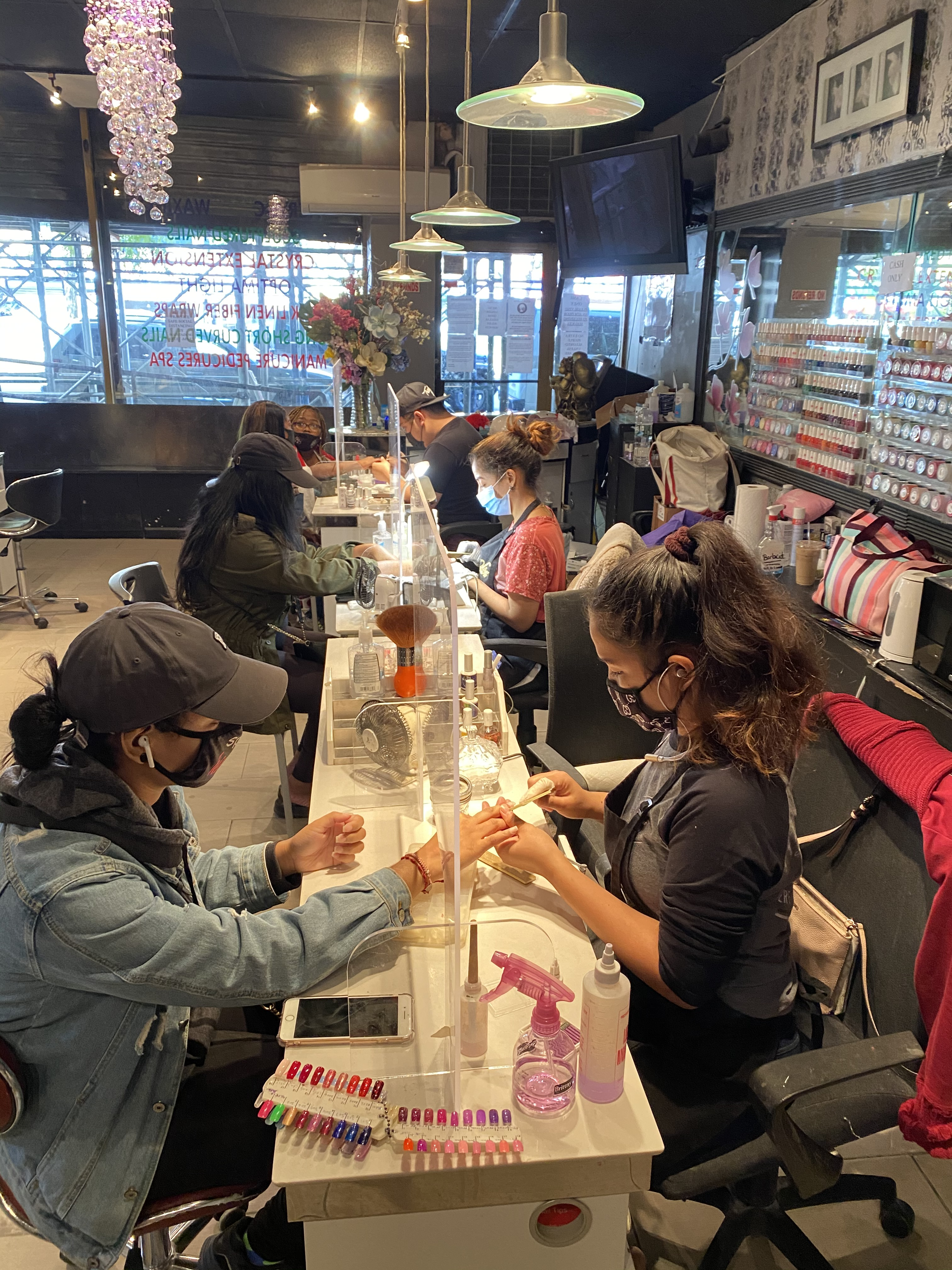
Bui's salon

Jenny Bui (born c. 1969) is a Cambodian-American nail artist known for her crystal-studded creations. She was named Nail Artist Influencer of the Year in 2019 and is known as "The Queen of Bling."

Among her clients are Love & Hip Hop cast member Yandy Smith and rapper Cardi B. Her designs have become part of Cardi B's signature look.

== Early life and education ==
Bui was born around 1970 in Cambodia, one of nine children. Her father was a cook and her mother a street vendor; both are Chinese. She was five when the Khmer Rouge came into power, and her family fled when she was eight, spending years trying to escape; a younger brother died of starvation-related illness. Bui and family members fled to Thailand, then Vietnam.

When she was fourteen she and her mother and a brother immigrated to Montreal, sponsored by an older brother who was already there. She waited tables and picked strawberries, eventually getting a job in a dental office. At 22 she married and in the 1990s moved to the Bronx with her husband. She had her first child at 23 and her second at 25. After her second child was born she attended cosmetology school, planning to style hair, but switched to nails after watching a manicurist. She had her third child at 28, after which she became a single mother when she and her husband divorced.

== Career ==
Bui first worked in a sister-in-law's salon. Four months later she opened her own nail salon in the Bronx but didn't make enough money; she sold it for $3000 and opened another in Harlem. She described being verbally abused by racist customers at the Harlem shop.

While at the Harlem salon and newly divorced, she developed her "signature style" using Swarovski crystals applied to acrylic nails in intricate patterns that "[turn] nail art into jewelry." Her style was originally inspired by an article in a Japanese nail magazine a friend had sent her. She specializes in long nails in "stiletto, almond, and coffin shapes" that can take up to three hours to produce and cost up to $300. According to Vogue, 1.5 inches (3.8 cm) is the shortest nail length she's willing to work with. Her creations have earned her the nickname "The Queen of Bling."

Her work caught the attention of Love & Hip Hop's Smith, who became a client and helped her set up an Instagram account to showcase her designs.

In 2012 Cardi B, then still working as a stripper at upscale club Sioux's, became a client of Bui at the Harlem salon; Bui designs acrylics 2 inches (5.1 cm) to 4.5 inches (11 cm) long for her. Cardi B has referred to her as "a second mom." Bui's design for Cardi B's 2018 Grammy appearance "helped bring bling back into the mainstream" according to Christina Parella writing for NYCGo. Bui's designs have become a part of Cardi B's signature look and were featured in a 2019 Super Bowl commercial the rapper appeared in.

Other fashion and beauty influencers also contributed to Bui's increasing prominence. Bui has a partnership with Swarovski and her own line of nail polish, Jenny Secret.

As of 2020 Bui has two salons, Jenny's Spa in the Bronx's Fordham neighborhood and Nails on 7th in Harlem, and 20 employees.

== Recognition ==
Bui was named Make Up Artist Influencer of the Year award at the 2019 American Influencer Awards. She was a judge for the 2020 Beauty Envision Awards.

== In popular culture ==
Bui was impersonated by drag performer Gia Gunn on season 4 of RuPaul's Drag Race All Stars.

== Personal life ==
Bui has been married three times. She has three children with her first husband and two with her second husband. She met her second husband, Billy Bui, who owned an auto body shop, in 2004.
