= Deborah Lippmann =

American manicurist and singer

- Deborah Lippmann brand logo
- Occupations: Celebrity and fashion manicurist, Singer (2004, 2007)
- Known for: Deborah Lippmann Nail Color (Co-Founder)

Deborah Lippmann is a celebrity and fashion manicurist who has designed nail polishes for stars such as Lady Gaga, Scarlett Johansson, Kim Kardashian, Julia Roberts, Gwyneth Paltrow, Taylor Swift and Lena Dunham. She has her own line of nail polishes with names inspired by the titles of popular songs. Her nail polishes and views on current trends in nail fashion are often reviewed in popular beauty and nail magazines and blogs. She is known for keeping up with trends in nail color and design. To supplement existing nail-polish formulations and colors, she has collaborated with a chemist to create new ones. Her eponymous line of nail lacquers, treatments and lipsticks was founded in 1999 with her husband, Jude Severin who oversees sales and operations and her brother, Mark Lippmann, who oversees marketing, creative and everything digital. Mark has been a keynote speaker at WWD Digital Forum, Digital Marketing World Forum, Fashion Digital, Brand Innovators, eTail, in New York, Los Angeles, London, Boston, Philadelphia and more.

Lippmann created collections inspired by the HBO series Girls and True Blood. Lippmann often collaborates with a number of her clients to create customized nail polish shades, including "Sarah Smile" for Sarah Jessica Parker, "Bad Romance" for Lady Gaga and "Walk Away Renée" for Renée Zellweger.

Lippmann is also a singer. Her public performances include a CD release concert at Joe's Pub and a rendition of the national anthem at a Chicago Cubs game. Deborah has recorded two solo albums by Broadway composer Martin Charnin, Donny Osmond and others.
