= Park Eun-kyung (nail artist) =

South Korean nail artist (born 1982)

Park Eun-kyung (Korean: 박은경; born 1982) is a South Korean nail artist. She opened her nail salon Unistella in 2014 and has been described as by The New York Times as "arguably South Korea's most famous nail artist".

She is known for starting the trends of shattered glass manicures, wire manicures, and negative-space manicures.
