= Fingering (sexual act) =

Use of fingers to sexually stimulate

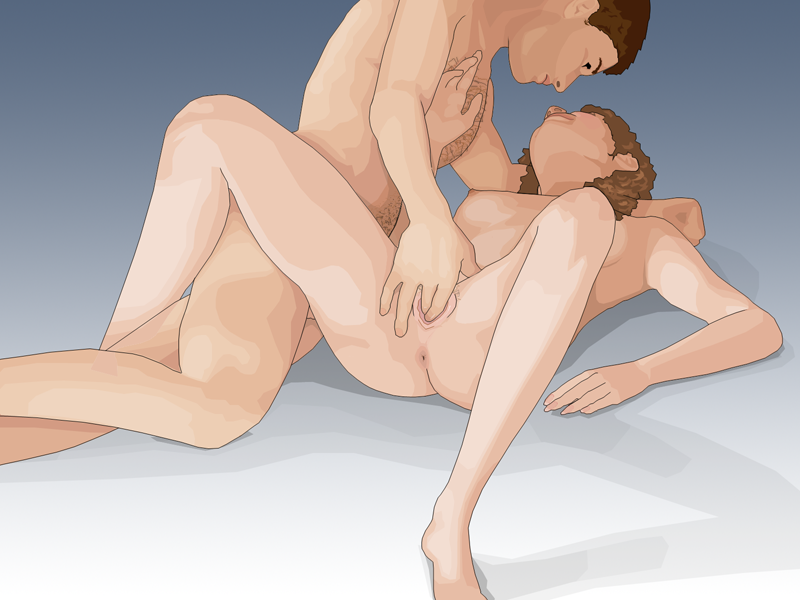
Illustration of a man fingering a woman

Fingering is sexual stimulation of the vulva (including the clitoris) or vagina by using the fingers. Vaginal fingering is medically called digital (vaginal) penetration. The term "digital" takes its significance from the English word 'digit', which refers to a finger, thumb, or toe. Fingering may also include the use of fingers to stimulate the anus. When someone performs fingering on another person's vulva or vagina, it is a form of manual sex, and is analogous to a handjob (manual stimulation of the penis). It may be used for sexual arousal or foreplay, constitute an entire sexual encounter, or be used as non-penetrative sexual activity. Fingering performed on one's own vulva or vagina is a form of masturbation.

== Practice ==
The main aspect of fingering, whether performed on oneself or performed on someone else, is manual stimulation of the vulva by rubbing with the fingers, insertion of the fingers into the vagina through its opening, or some combination.

=== Vulva ===
Parts of the vulva, especially the clitoris, are erogenous zones. Massage of the vulva, and in particular the clitoris, is the most common way for a woman to achieve an orgasm. Studies indicate that 70–80 percent of women require direct clitoral stimulation to achieve orgasm.

The clitoral glans or shaft may be massaged by one or more fingers, usually through the skin of the clitoral hood, using up-and-down, side-to-side, or circular motions. The rest of the vulva such as the labia are also stimulated by fingering. The fingers may caress the labia minora (the vulva's inner lips) via up-and-down/side-to-side movements as well or tug on the folds.

=== Vagina ===
While the vagina is not especially sensitive as a whole, its lower third (the area close to the entrance) has concentrations of nerve endings that can provide pleasurable sensations when stimulated during sexual activity.

Fingering the vagina is often performed to stimulate an area termed the G-spot. The G-spot is reportedly located roughly five centimeters (2.0 inches) up on the anterior wall of the vagina, forwards toward the navel. It is described as being recognized by its ridges and slightly rougher texture compared to the more cushion-like vaginal cavity walls around it. Fingering this spot, and in effect possibly stimulating the Skene's gland, is commonly cited as a method that may lead to female ejaculation.

Some women have cited the "come hither" approach as a significant catalyst to orgasm. This technique involves the middle finger, sometimes additionally the index or ring finger, making a hand gesture like "come here" with the palm facing upwards towards her pubic bone. Medical professionals suggest washing the hands before contact with the vagina, to ensure proper hygiene, especially when moving between different orifices.

=== Anus ===
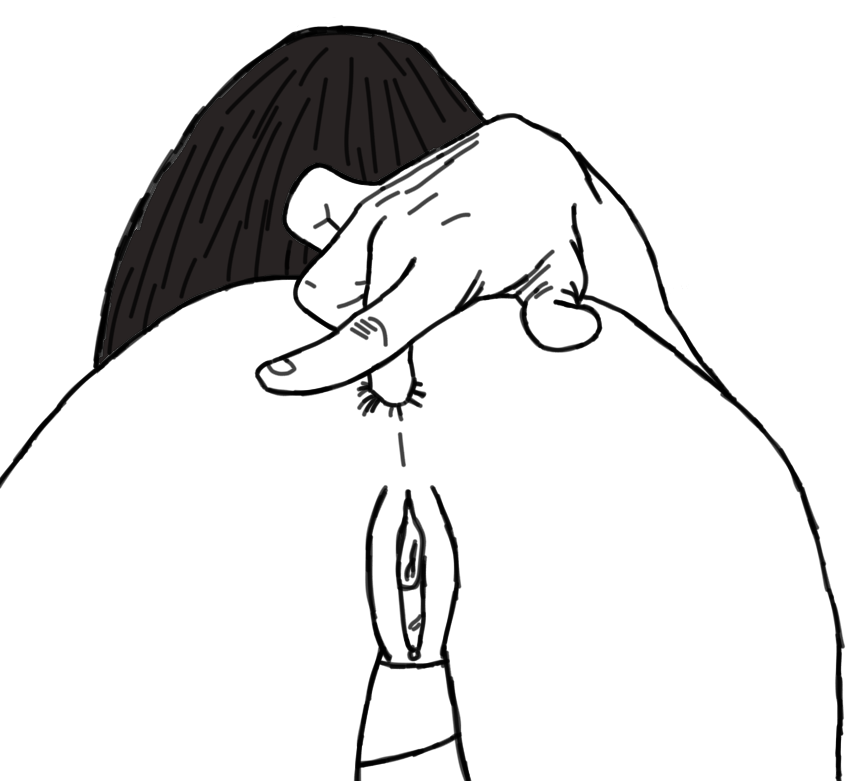
A woman fingering her own anus

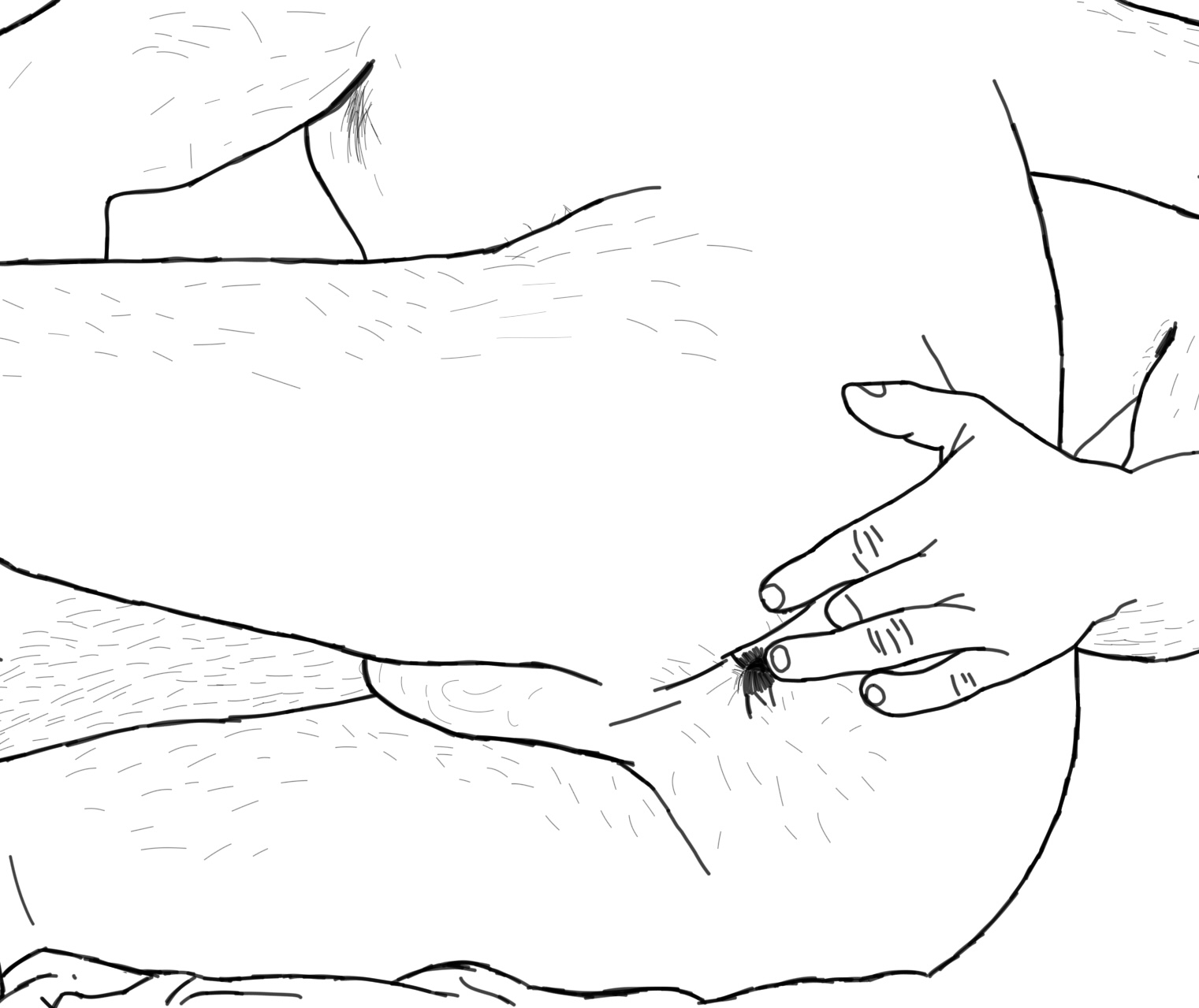
A man anally fingering another man

Anal fingering may be pleasurable because of the large number of nerve endings in the anal area, and because of the added stimulation gained from stretching the anal sphincter muscles while inserting the finger. A personal lubricant is advisable to both increase the pleasurable sensation and aid insertion. Some people prefer to simply stimulate the outer ring of the anus, while others will follow this by inserting one or more fingers into the rectum.

Fingering one's own anus is an act of anal masturbation while fingering the anus of another person is a type of manual and anal sex. Partnered anal fingering can arouse the receiver, either as an act in itself or allowing them to relax their anus and prepare them for the insertion of a penis or any other sexual instrument.

Anal fingering is an effective way of stimulating the prostate in males and can also stimulate the perineal sponge in women.

== Safety and sexual assault ==
Consensual fingering is generally considered safe sex.

How digital penetration without consent is legally classified depends on the jurisdiction. For example, penetration of the vagina or anus with a finger without consent is rape in Australia, and forcible rape in many United States jurisdictions. In Scotland, the term rape is only used for penetration with a penis, whereas penetration with a finger can be "sexual assault by penetration".

Lesbian women often clip their nails in a particular fashion to allow for digital penetration, leading to recognition of shorter nails on the index and middle finger as a public LGBT symbol.

However, although it may be considered safe sex, if it is done without care or without lubrication, it can create small tears in the lining of both the vagina, as well as the rectum. This increases the chance HIV transmission during unprotected penetrative sex.

== See also ==
- Cunnilingus
- Fisting
- Human female sexuality
