= Pedicure =

Cosmetic treatment of the feet and toenails

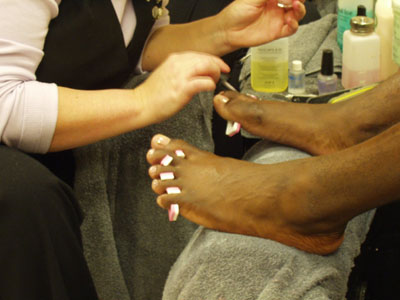
A pedicure in progress

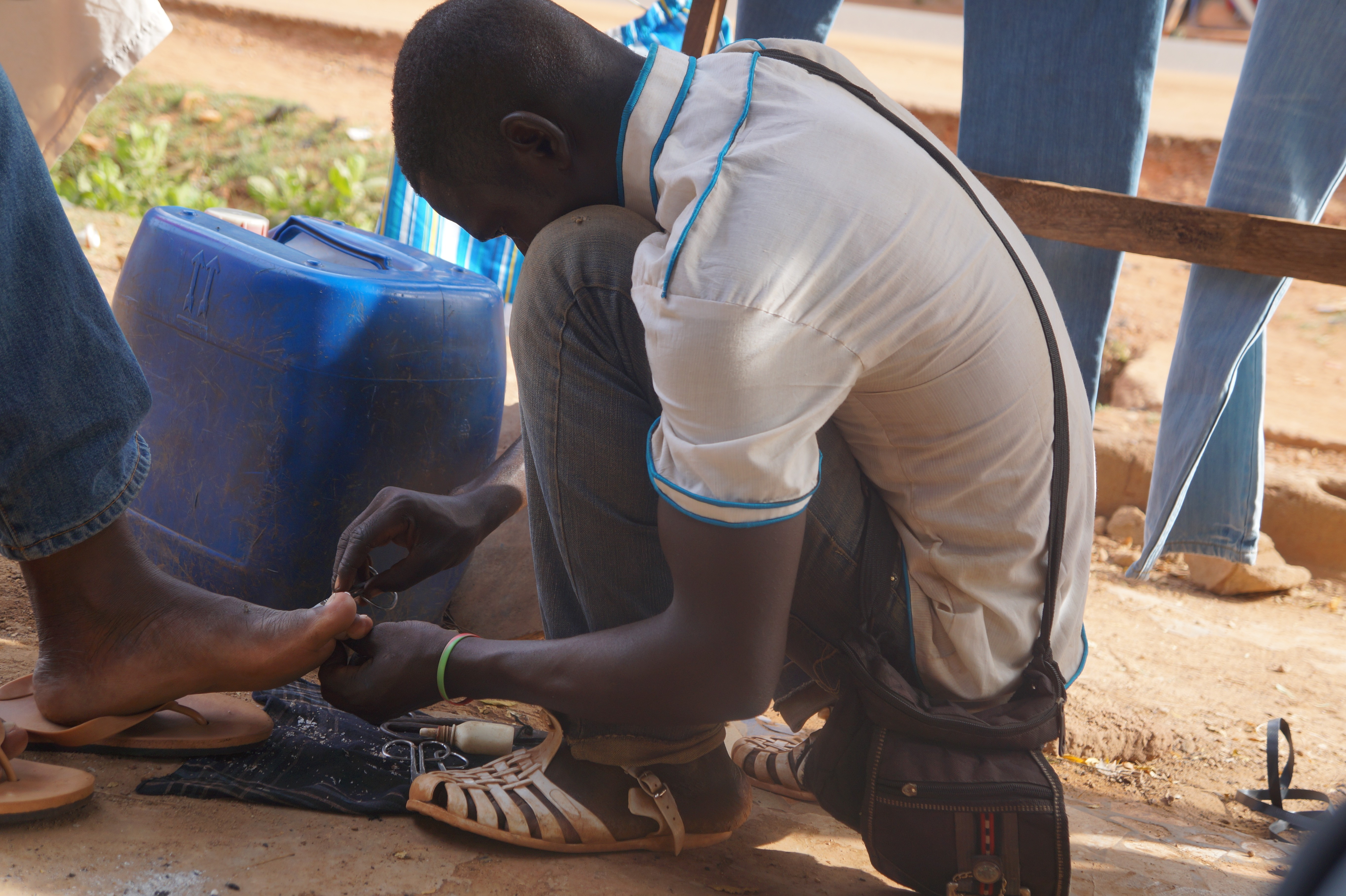
Street pedicure in Bamako

A pedicure is a cosmetic treatment of the feet and toenails, analogous to a manicure.

A pedicure includes dead skin cells being rubbed off the bottom of the feet using a rough stone (often a pumice stone). Skincare is frequently provided up to the knee, including granular exfoliation, moisturizing, and massage. The word pedicure is derived from the Latin words pedis, which means "of the foot", and cura, which means "care".

== History ==
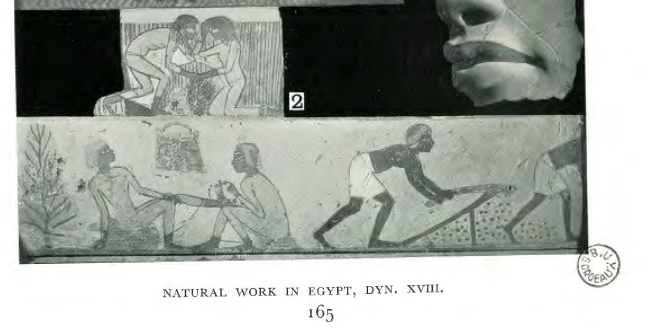

People have been pedicuring their nails for more than 4,000 years. In southern Babylonia, noble people used solid gold tools to give themselves manicures and pedicures. Nail polish can be traced back even further. Originating in China in 3000 BC, nail color indicated a person's social status according to a Ming Dynasty manuscript; royal fingernails were painted black and red. Ancient Egyptians have been manicuring since 2300 BC.

A depiction of early manicures and pedicures was found on a carving from a pharaoh's tomb, and the Egyptians were known for paying special attention to their feet and legs. The Egyptians also colored their nails, using red to show the highest social class. It is said that Cleopatra's nails were painted a deep red, and Queen Nefertiti used a ruby shade. In ancient Egypt and Rome, military commanders painted their nails to match their lips before going into battle.

== Pedicures in the United States ==
Pedicures generally take approximately 45 minutes to an hour in the US. According to the US Department of Labor, manicure and pedicure specialists earned a median income of $34,660 in 2024. Most professionals earn an hourly wage or salary, which can be augmented by tips from customers. Independent nail technicians depend on repeat and consistent business to earn a living. The most successful independent manicure technicians were stated to earn salaries of over $50,000 per year in 2015. Nail technicians can earn up to $100 per hour from performing more technical nail treatments, such as a French pedicure and sculpting, although these treatments are not popular for the feet. According to Statista, in 2019, the price of a standard pedicure treatment was $35.46 compared to $31.88 in 2008.

== Risks ==
Improper or unsanitary pedicures can increase the risk of infection. First, some pedicure practices can damage the skin if performed too aggressively and thus increase infection risk. For example, using a pumice stone to shave off calluses on the sole can result in abrasions, and cuticle nippers may accidentally remove too much of the cuticle. Second, instruments or foot baths may not be properly sterilized, introducing pathogens into already vulnerable skin. Mycobacterium fortuitum is known to cause infection in foot spas. These risks are particularly high for people with medical conditions that affect blood flow, sensation, immune response, or healing in the feet, such as diabetes. Major health organizations such as the CDC recommend that diabetics do not soak their feet or remove calluses and often have a podiatrist cut their toenails, which are some of the key parts of many pedicures.

Solutions and chemicals used to cleanse or soak feet can also cause skin irritation. There can be a risk of developing an ingrown toenail from improper trimming.
