= Artificial nails =

Beauty accessories

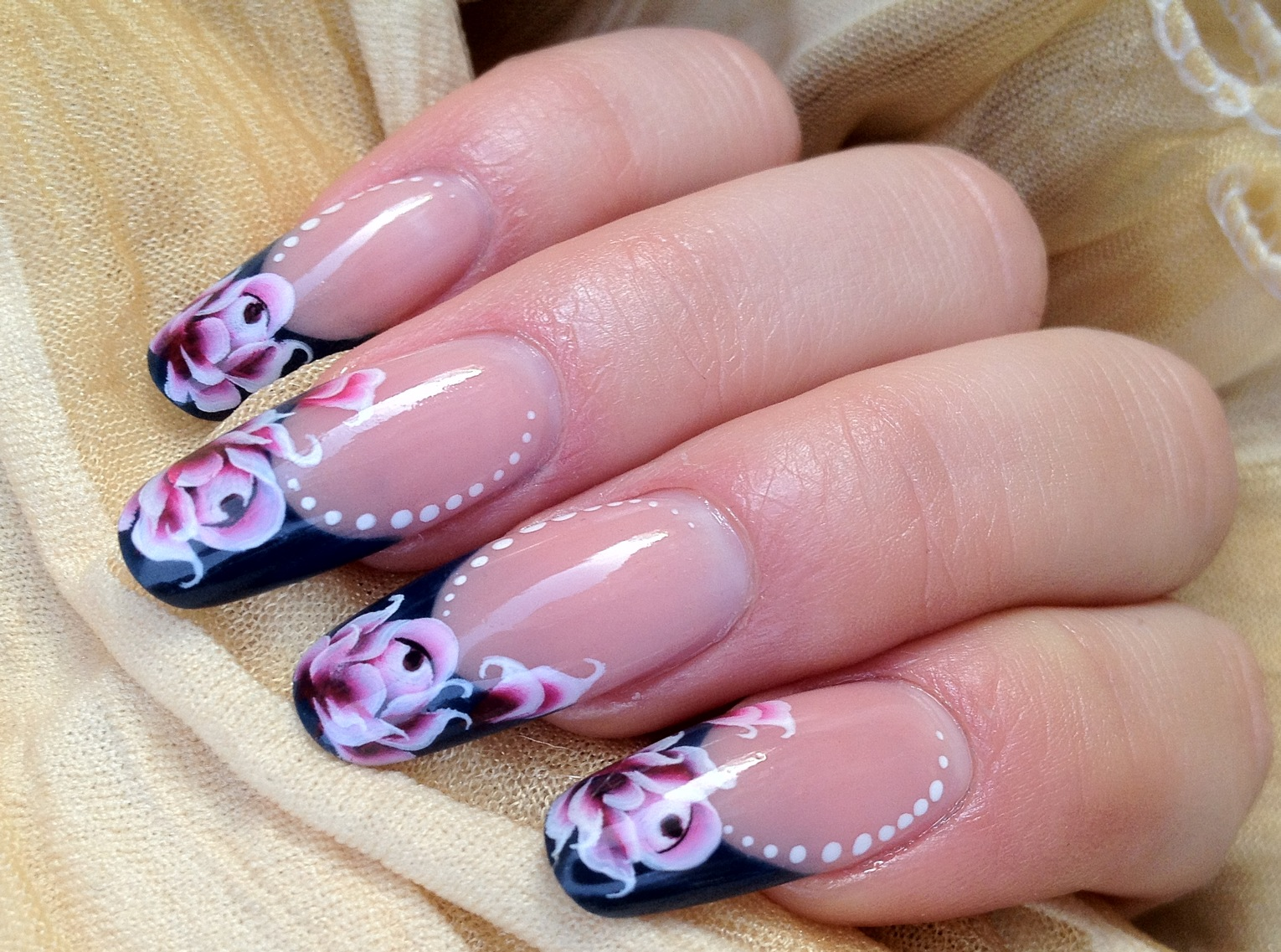
Artificial nails with hand painted nail art.

Artificial nails, also known as fake nails, false nails, acrylic nails, press ons, acrylics, gel nails, nail extensions or nail enhancements, are extensions placed over fingernails as fashion accessories. Many artificial nail designs attempt to mimic the appearance of real fingernails as closely as possible, while others may deliberately stray in favor of an artistic look.

Artificial nails require regular upkeep: it is recommended that they be attended to, on average, every three weeks, as human fingernails in healthy young persons have been found to grow some 3.47 mm/month; however, they may last over one month.

== Types ==
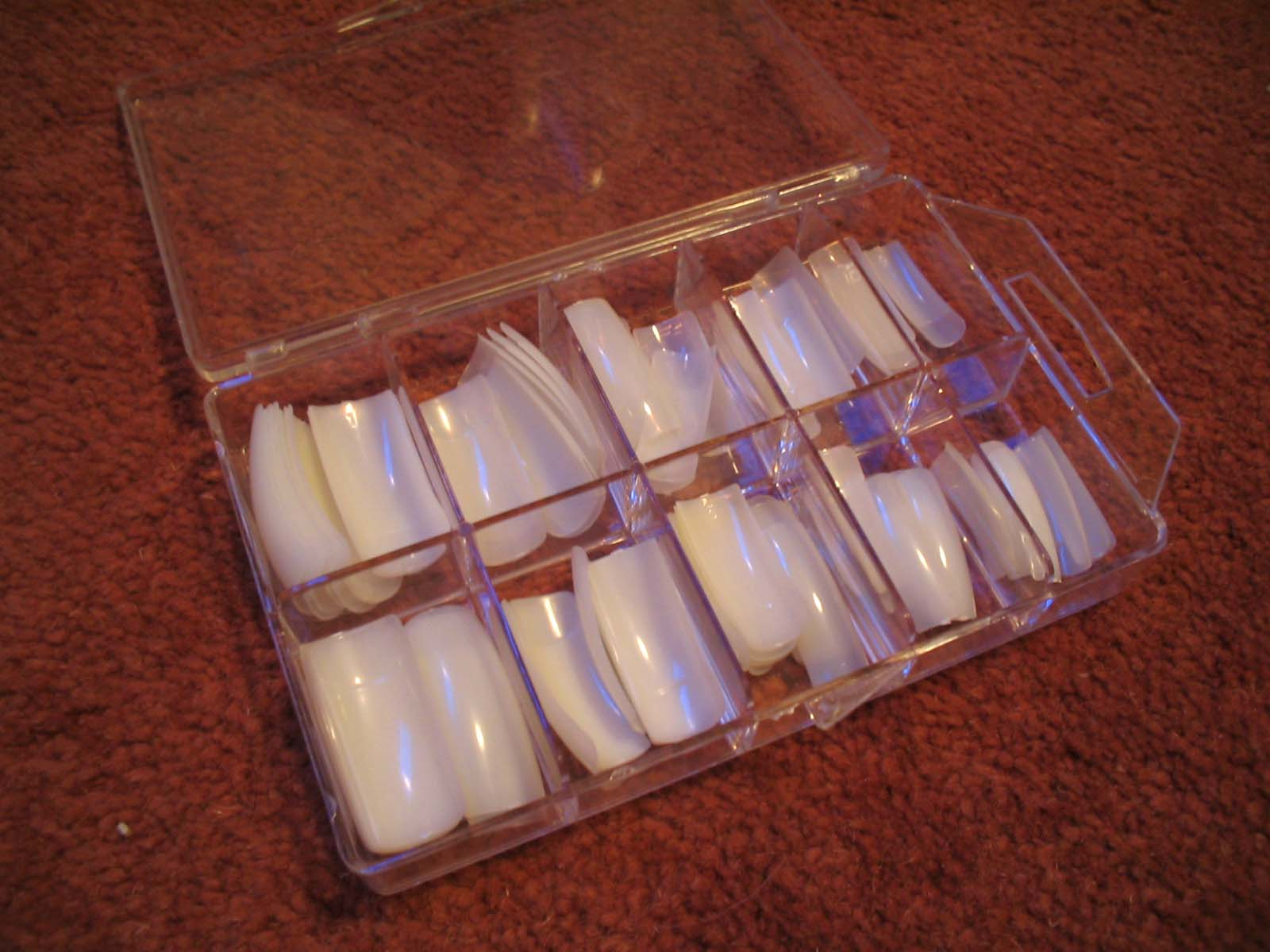
A pack of half-cover nail tips. Each compartment has different tip sizes.

Artificial nails are an extension, not a replacement, of natural nails. There are two main approaches to creating artificial nails – tips and forms:

- A tip is a heavyweight nail-shaped plastic plate glued on the end of the natural nail, or, if it is a full-cover tip or "press-on", glued on top of the entire nailbed, and can have gel, dip or acrylic added on top
- A form is a shaped sheet with a sticky edge that is effectively attached to the tip of the finger and wrapped around the entirety of the nail to form an extension: this offers more creative control over the final shape of the artificial nail

Atop these, either acrylic, hard gel, or any combination of both may be applied. Tips are available in many different designs, ranging from solid colors like gel or regular nail polish, to graphic designs such as animal prints and metallic colors. In addition to polishes, other embellishments may be used, such as rhinestones, glitter, stickers, fimo charms and striping tape, to add more to the artificial nail's design. Artificial nails can be shaped, cut, and filed into a variety of shapes, including square, squared oval/"squoval", rounded, almond, ballerina/coffin, mountain peak, lipstick, and stiletto.

=== Acrylic nails ===
Acrylic nails are made out of acrylic glass. The conventional technology employs polymer beads synthesized from ethyl methacrylate (poly-EMA). When it is mixed with a liquid monomer (usually ethyl methacrylate mixed with some inhibitor) it forms a malleable bead. This mixture begins to cure immediately, continuing until completely solid in minutes. Acrylic nails can last up to 21 days but can last longer with touch-ups. To give acrylic nails color, gel polish, nail polish, and dip powders can be applied. Use of MMA (Methyl methacrylate liquid monomers) acrylics are strongly discouraged and banned in some states as it can cause damage to the natural nail, asthma; irritated eyes, skin, nose, and mouth; difficulty concentrating; loss of smell and kidney issues. A suitable alternative is EMA (Ethyl Methacrylate Liquid Monomers) in salon use.

=== Gel nails ===
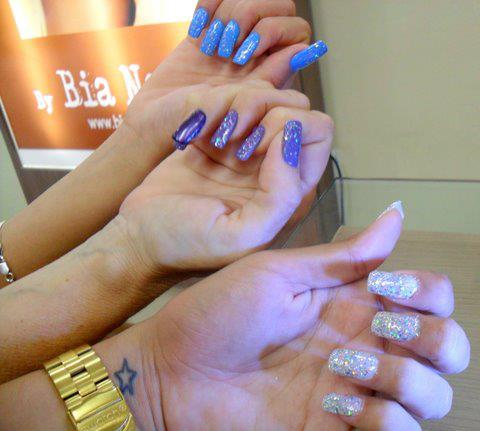
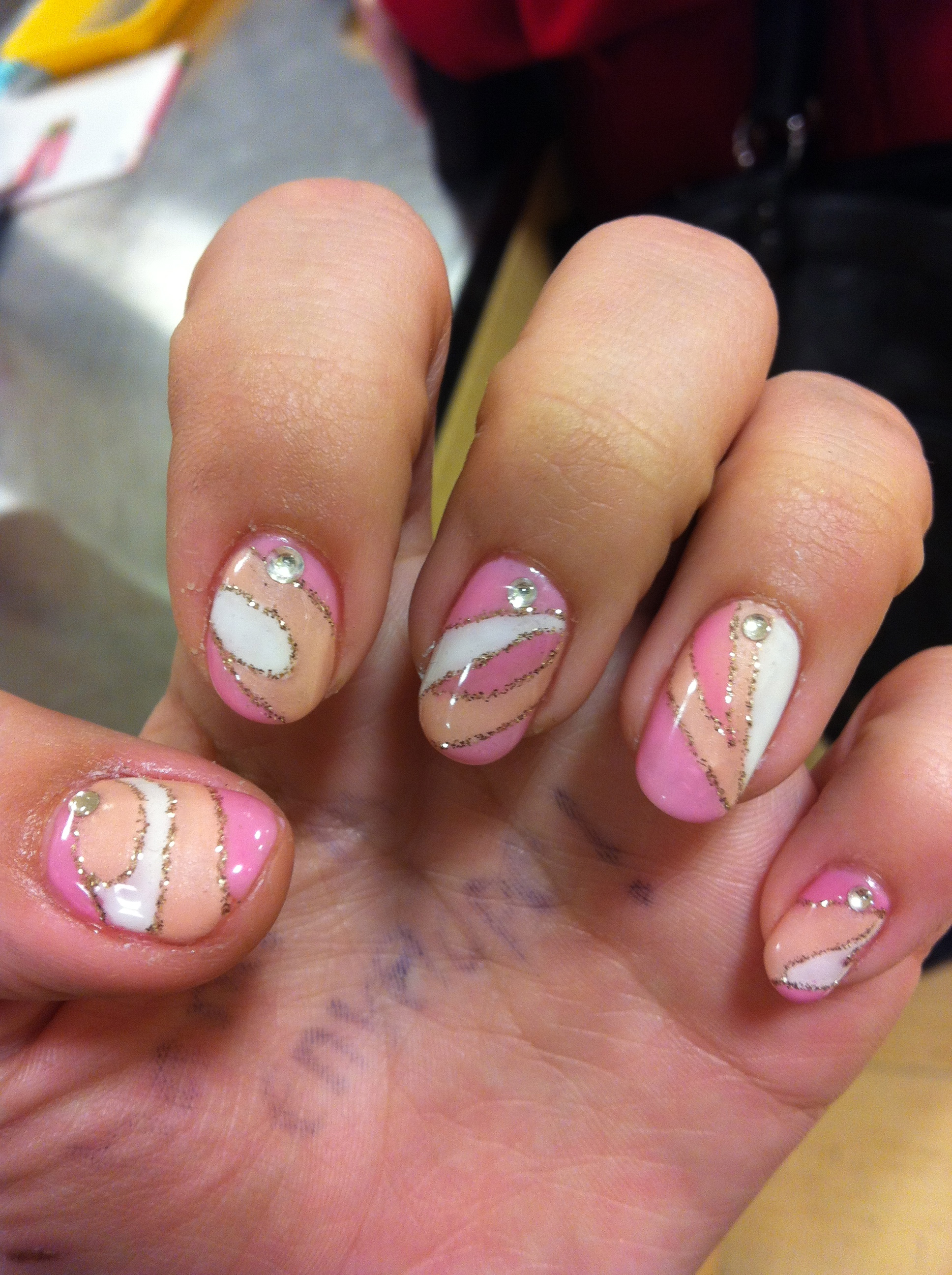
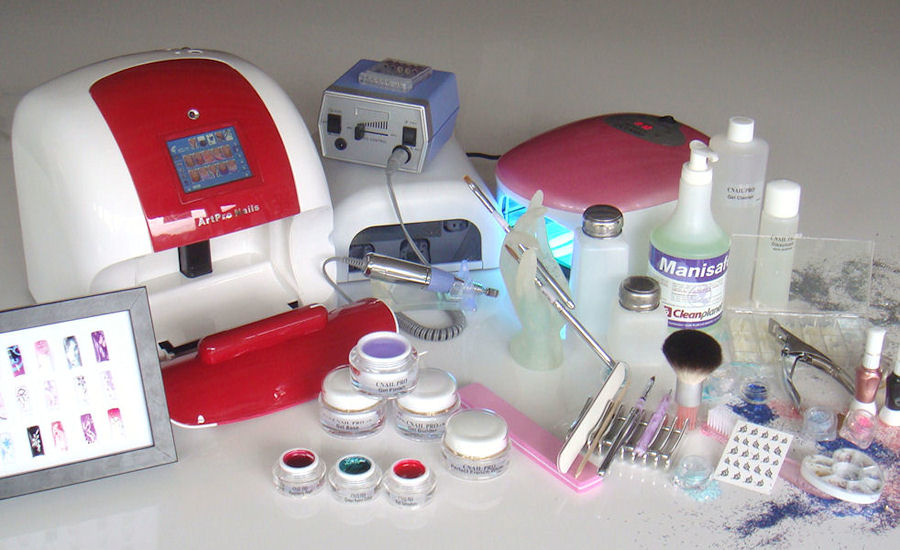
Gel nail extensions and gel nail polish. Below are various manicure tools including a UV lamp for curing gel nails.

Gel nails can be utilised in order to create artificial nail extensions, but can also be used like nail polish. They are hardened or cured by using ultraviolet light, that increases its durability, with lasting power of two to three weeks.It also chips less often compared to regular nail polish. They can have a high-gloss finish, or matte finish depending on the type of topcoat used.

Gel nails are strong, although not as strong as acrylic or fiberglass nails, and tend to be more expensive.

Acetone does not dissolve some types of gel nails, so they have to be removed at a salon by buffing and filing, usually with an electric nail file. Repeated buffing can lead to thinning of the nail plate until the buffed nails fully grow out. Improper application of gel nail products, including soft gel tips, polygel, gel polish, and builder gel can lead to fungal infections and allergic reactions.

A new gel nail extension was created circa 2017 that is commonly referred to as Gel-X, or soft gel tips. It is a soft gel nail tip that is precut in differing styles and lengths which covers the whole nail bed up to the end of the nail. Gel-X are applied by first applying a PH bonder (dehydrator) followed by an acid-free gel primer. Finally, it is glued on using a gel adhesive that is cured using a UV light. The removal process of gel-X nails is dissolving in acetone for 20 minutes.

=== Nail wraps ===
Nail wraps are formed by cutting pieces of fiberglass, linen, silk fabric, or another material to fit on the surface of the nail (or a tip attached prior), to be sealed onto the nail plate with a layer of resin or glue. They do not damage the nail and also provide strength to the nail but are not used to lengthen it – and they can also be used to fix broken nails. The treatment is, however, more expensive. Nail wraps last 5–7 days, but can last longer if worn and used correctly. To take nail wraps off correctly, the wrap should be soaked in acetone for long enough to soften the adhesive.

=== Nail tips ===
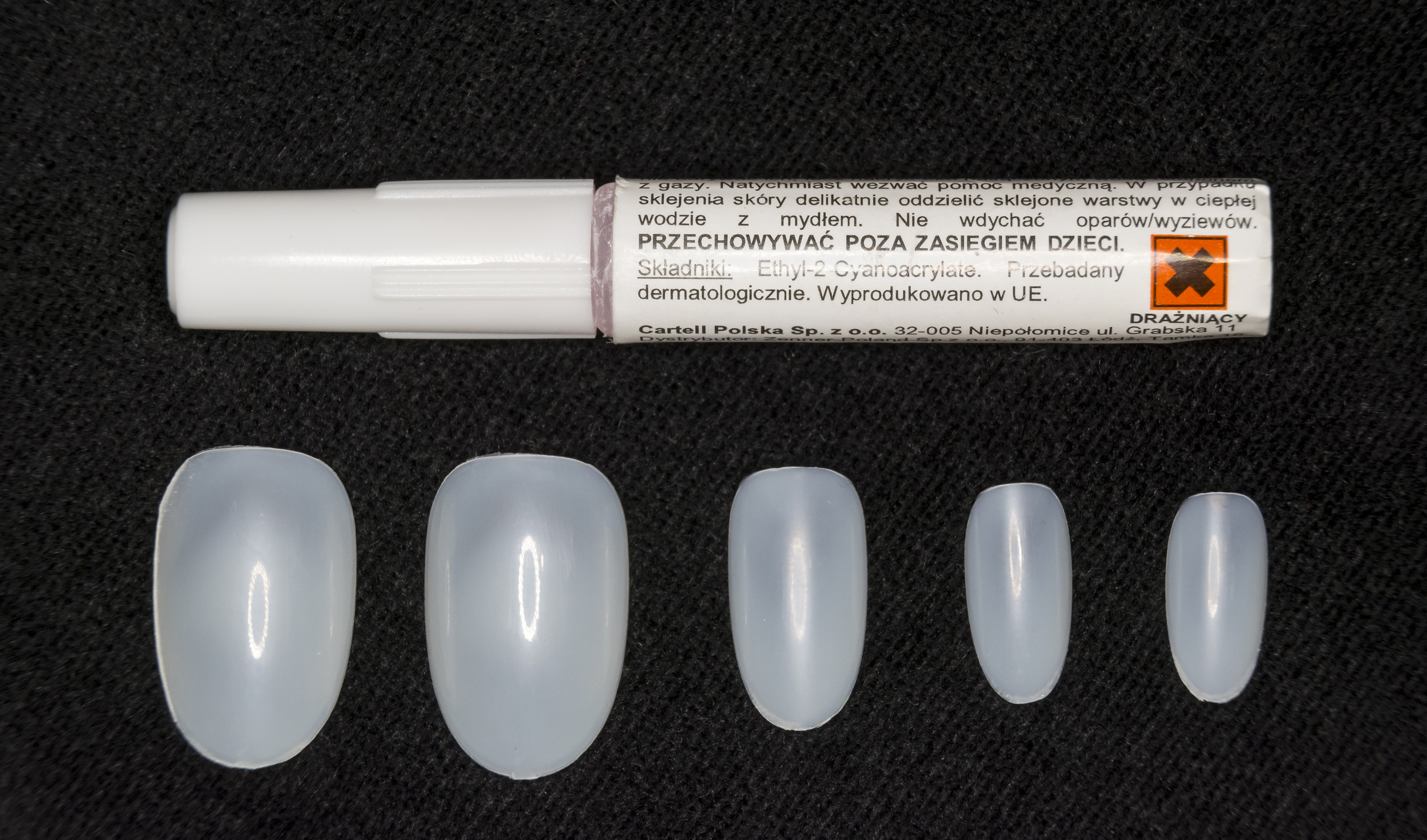
Press-on nail tips, and cyanoacrylate nail glue

Nail tips are made of a strong bendable material called acrylonitrile butadiene styrene (ABS). Nail tips are attached to the natural nail to extend its length and provides room for more nail designs. They can come in many different shapes, sizes, and colors, but the most popular ones are usually clear or white. They only last for 7–10 days.

Some nail tips can also be made out of soft gel, for stronger applications when tips are the sole extension, with no other product on top. Gel-X is an example of a soft gel nail tip system. Soft gel tips are always clear to ensure the gel glue can be fully cured under UV light.

=== Dip powder ===
With the dip powder method, a clear liquid is brushed onto a nail and the nail is then placed into dip powder, similar to what is used in the application of acrylic nails. The process is repeated multiple times, depending on how long the extension is. Dip nails tend to last about a month, two-to-three weeks longer than gel and acrylic nails. It can be worn on natural nails, nails with added tips, or can create artificial nails. Dip-powder enhancements can also be used for quick nail repairs. Dip-powder nails do not require any UV/LED light to cure: instead they are cured using an activator. The quickest way to remove dip powder is to drill, clip off or buff out layers of the powder so that, when they are soaked in acetone, they simply slide off.

== History ==
Historically, artificial nails were common symbols of status all across the world:

- During the Ming Dynasty of China, noblewomen wore very long artificial nails as a status symbol indicating that, unlike commoners, they did not have to do manual labor.
- In early 19th century Greece, upper-class women often wore empty pistachio shells over their nails, slowly spreading the artificial nail trend across Europe.

"The earliest experiments and resultant artificial nails used a monomer and polymer mix applied to the nail and extended over a supporting form. This structure hardened and, when the support was removed, was then shaped to look like a natural extension of the nail plate. These dental materials were chemicals that came under the 'family' name of acrylics: thus the acrylic artificial nail was created. All materials subsequently used also belong to the acrylic family, but the term 'acrylic nails' has stuck to the method of using a liquid monomer and powder polymer."

In 1878, Mary E. Cobb opened the first manicure salon in Manhattan. This came after studying nail care in France and marrying podiatrist, J. Parker Pray. During the 1920s, short well-manicured round nails were a symbol of wealth. Revlon made their first appearance in 1932 with only one single product, long lasting formula nail enamel.

In 1954, Dr. Fred Slack Jr., a dentist, cut his thumb nail at work, and created an artificial nail using dental acrylic resin and aluminum foil as a realistic-looking temporary replacement. After experiments with different materials to perfect his invention, he and his brother, Tom, patented a successful version and started the company Patti Nails. Fred Slack used his dental equipment and chemicals to replace his natural nail, but over time the process has significantly changed.

In the late 20th century, artificial nails for women became widely popular all over the world. In today's time there are even nail styling competitions. Judges of these nail competitions look for consistency from nail to nail. They also judge whether or not the nails complement the model's hands. If the nails are beautiful, but too long for the model's hands, the judge will count off points. The competitors will be judged on how neat their work space is and how organized they are.

== Health effects ==
=== Perceived benefits ===
Acrylic nails help conceal or fix broken, damaged, short, or otherwise considered "undesirable" nail appearance. They also help prevent nail biting, breakage, and splits. They are used when people are not able to grow the length and strength of natural nails that they desire or simply desire a new fashion look. This problem can be solved by using certain nail techniques such as nail tipping, sculptured nails, nail wrapping, or acrylic overlays. With improper removal, acrylic nails often damage natural nails. An experienced nail technician should assist with this to ensure nail health.

=== Health risks ===
==== Nail infection and damage to natural nail ====
If fitted properly, artificial nails are usually not problematic. However, long term use and poorly fitted nails can seriously damage the nail bed and hamper natural nail growth. Natural nails may become thin and weaken with frequent touch-ups. The most common problem associated with artificial nails is a fungal infection that may develop between the false and natural nails.

When artificial nails are applied to the natural nail surface, minor types of trauma to the artificial nails which can happen from something as harmless as scraping or bumping a nail against a firm surface can cause separation of the nail from its nail bed. This allows bacteria and fungus to potentially enter the separated area setting up an infection and bacterial burden. Many hospitals and healthcare facilities do not allow employees to have long fingernails, fake or real, due to the risk of said nails harboring microbes that could transmit diseases to patients. Infection can also be a risk when nails are applied by a disreputable nail salon that does not follow sanitary practices.

==== Hand hygiene risks ====
The use of nail polish and artificial nails make proper hand hygiene and hand washing more difficult, because they are more difficult to clean than natural nails. Therefore, in professions where hand hygiene is important, such as when handling food or providing patient care, nail polish and artificial nails are usually forbidden. For example, a guideline of the National Health Service explicitly forbids both during patient care activity. The Food and Agriculture Organization publishes similar advice for the food retail sector. However, an article published on the American Journal of Infection Control suggest that the presence of nail polish or gel nails does not increase bacterial burden if proper hand hygiene was performed.

==== Hyponychium damage ====
Hyponychium is the skin underneath the free edge of the nail; it serves as a barrier to keeping debris and germs from getting under the nail and should avoid being cut or trimmed. The skin in this area also contains white blood cells to help fight infection. Cutting or overfilling the hyponychium can cause severe pain, bleeding, and can lead to infections in the nail bed. Instead of trying to cut it or file it down, apply cuticle oil daily to the hyponychium to reduce its thickness and soften the skin, which will gradually migrate the hyponychium downward. When trimming the natural nail, keep it longer than the hyponychium to reduce the chance of injury to the area. While getting acrylic nails done, the e-file (the hand drill used for filing the acrylic) works closely to the hyponychium. As the nail tech is drilling closely to the hyponychium, it’s important to stay very still to avoid the hyponychium being nicked by the drill. If a person has high hyponychium, it is best to inform the nail tech beforehand.

==== Danger to nail salon workers ====
From an occupational health standpoint, there could be hazards to nail salon workers who are exposed to the chemical fumes from artificial nails during their entire work shift. Ethyl methacrylate can be used for artificial nails and can cause contact dermatitis, asthma, and allergies in the eyes and nose. Nail salon workers also face exposure to other chemicals used, such as toluene, dibutyl phthalate, and formaldehyde. The products used to make acrylic nails may also be flammable.

Exposure to methyl methacrylate (the precursor to acrylic glass) can cause drowsiness, light-headedness, and trembling of the hands, and so it has been banned for use in cosmetology in the majority of US states. Use of methyl methacrylate can cause skin reactions and damages to the natural nails, sometimes even permanently. Some signs that a nail salon is still using MMA might be prices that are significantly lower than most other nail salons. There will be an unusually strong and fruity odor. Also, the manicurist will often be wearing a mask to keep from breathing in the harmful chemical. Removal is much more difficult, and drills are more excessively used. Ethyl methacrylate is the safer alternative for MMA, but it costs several times as much and can still produce many effects.

Trimethylbenzoyl Diphenylphosphine Oxide (TPO) a photoinitiator used in gel nail polishes to accelerate curing, is classified as CMR (carcinogenic, mutagenic or toxic for reproduction) that results in reproductive risk with high levels of exposure. As of 1st September 2025, the European Union (EU) have prohibited the use of TPO in cosmetics, including nail products, under the Commission Regulation (EU) 2025/877.

== See also ==
- Fingerpick, placed on fingers to play stringed instruments
