= Golden slippers =

Golden slippers may refer to:

- Deciduous hoof capsule, a covering on the hooves of newborn foals, sometimes called "golden slippers"
- Golden Slippers, a spiritual popularised after the American Civil War
- Oh, Dem Golden Slippers, a United States minstrel song
- Paphiopedilum armeniacum, the "golden slipper orchid"
