= Accessory nail of the fifth toe =

Physical human trait

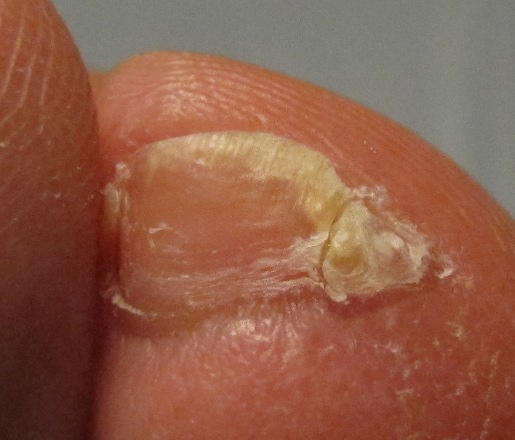
- An accessory toenail on a right foot
- Duration: Typically permanent once it develops

The accessory nail of the fifth toe, also known as a double nail of the fifth toe (DNFT) or a petaloid toenail, is a physical trait of the small toe, where a minuscule sixth toenail is present in the outer corner of the nail situated on the smallest toe. Although understudied and underreported, its prevalence is common.

== Description ==
The accessory nail was first described in a 1969 paper by M. Hundeiker. The trait can be observed on either one or both feet where there is a lengthwise separation of the toenail on the corner of smallest toe. The smaller sixth toenail separates from the main toenail on the outermost side of the foot, and protrudes outwards from the corner. This nail averages 2–7 mm (0.079–0.276 in) in length. The additional nail can be cut with a nail clipper. Its occurrence is considered common but underreported.

The entire nail of the small toe is usually short and wide, and both nails often share the same nail bed.

== Causes ==
The cause is poorly understood due to a lack of research, but genome-wide scans indicate that it is a heritable trait, and could be autosomal dominant. However, the wide variance in the size and structure of the accessory nail indicates that the trait may not follow a Mendelian pattern of inheritance, and may instead be a complex trait affected by multiple genes with minor genetic effects.

In some cases, the accessory nail presents with an abnormal protrusion or distortion of the fifth distal phalanx, or the splaying or rotation of the toe or entire foot. The trait may be a mild form of hexadactyly.

The condition may also appear following trauma to the toenail.

== Diagnosis ==
Accessory toenails are often observed by the patient and diagnosed upon examination by a physician. X-rays are sometimes used to investigate the underlying bone structure for deformity. Ena et al. proposed the diagnostic criteria have 4 components: presence at birth, potential inheritance, involvement of the fifth toe, and bilaterality.

Differential diagnoses include trauma-induced short-term splits, ectopic nails, onychophosis, and calluses.

== Treatment ==
Most people do not seek treatment because the accessory nail typically does not cause pain or other symptoms that interfere with everyday activities. However, the condition can sometimes cause discomfort or pain, particularly when the accessory nail protrudes vertically from the nail bed. For those who do choose treatment, an option is surgical or chemical matricectomy (complete removal or destruction of the nail matrix).

== Prevalence ==
Accessory toenails are relatively common despite descriptions of it in literature being rare. They were originally believed to be a feature of the Han Chinese due to the condition being rarely reported in other populations. A 2016 study showed that accessory toenails were found in people from various ethnic groups throughout the world, thus it is not a special racial or ethnic feature.

== In mythology ==
Chinese mythology has it that during the time of the Yellow Emperor, there were two types of people living in China: those who were the descendants of the Yellow Emperor, and those who were nomadic Qiang people. The Henan people, led by Yin Wang, attacked the Qiang and abducted a Qiang woman, who later tried to escape. Yin Wang stabbed her in the abdomen as she tried to escape, so she gave birth to two children with a scar on the small toe of the foot. The children were taken back by Yin Wang for adoption, and their descendants were born with double nails on their small toes.

== See also ==
- Congenital malformations of the dermatoglyphs
- Dominance (genetics)
- Epicanthic fold
- List of skin conditions
- Mongolian spot
