= Fingertip amputation =

- Other names: Fingertip avulsion, digital tip amputation
- A fingertip amputation
- Specialty: Emergency medicine, plastic surgery
- Causes: Cut; Crush; Tearing force
- Treatment: Dressings, surgery
- Prognosis: Generally good
- Frequency: Relatively common

Fingertip amputation, also known as fingertip avulsion, is the partial or complete loss of the tip of a finger. It may occur due to a cut, crush, or tearing force.

== Diagnosis ==
Several classification systems are used to describe fingertip amputations according to the level of tissue loss, distinguishing injuries involving the fingertip pulp, the area near the base of the nail, and the region before the lunula.

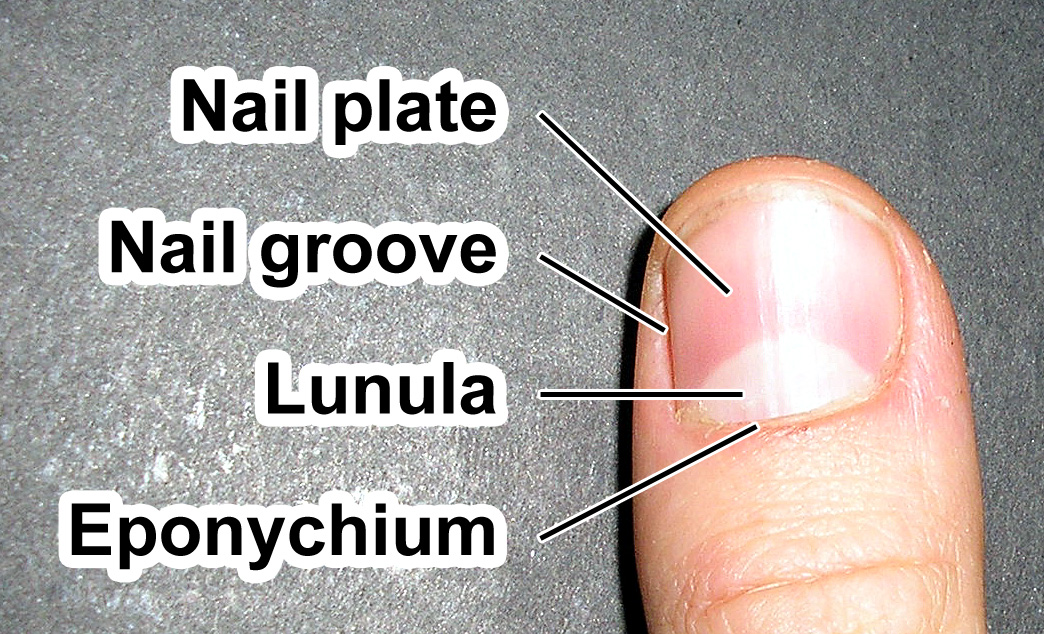
Nail

Classification system for amputation injuries.

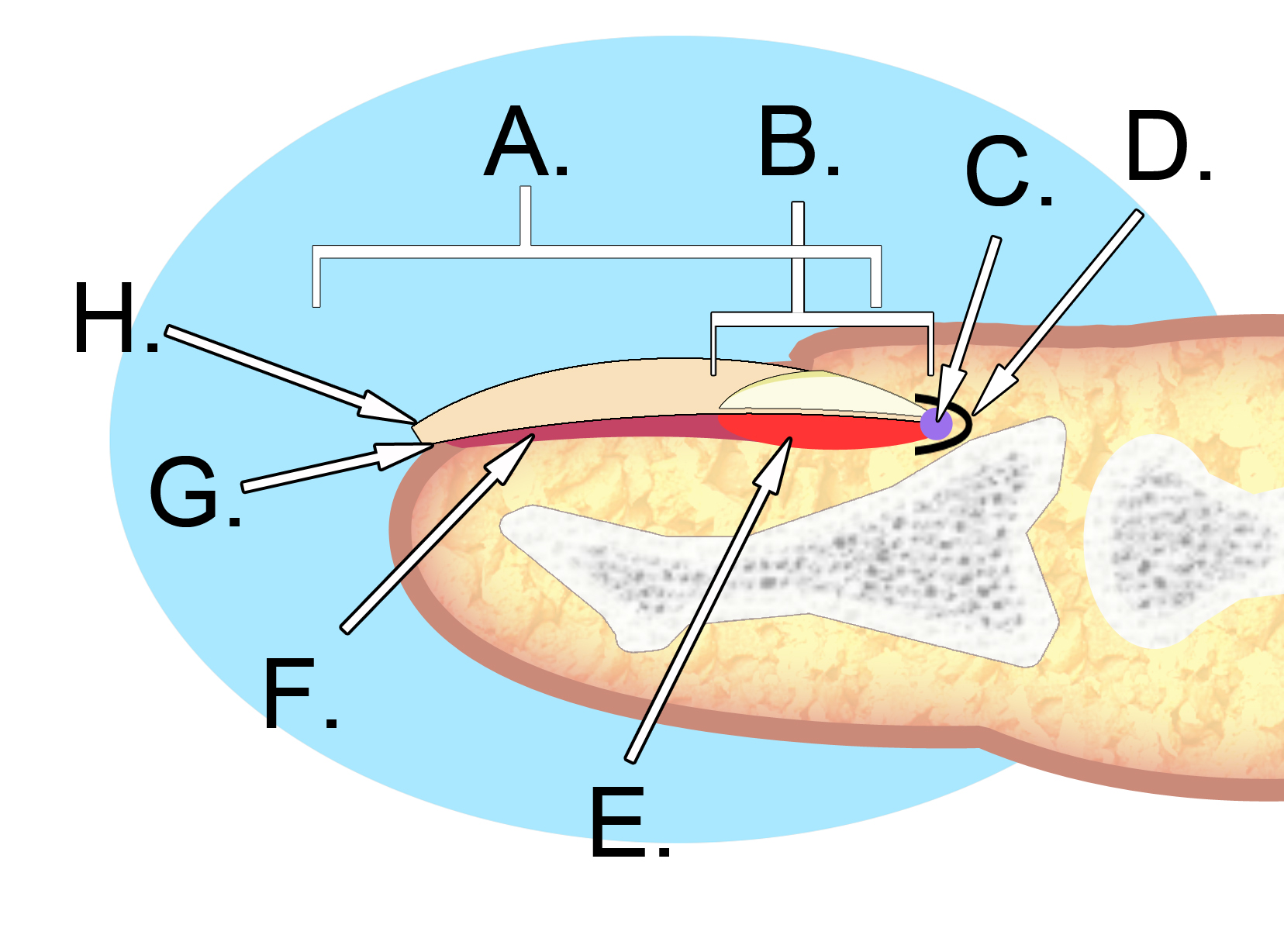
A. Nail plate; B. lunula; C. root; D. sinus; E. matrix; F. nail bed; G. hyponychium; H. free margin.

== Treatment ==
Simple dressing for a distal amputation injury

Management of fingertip amputations is determined by the extent, location and direction of the injury, in addition to whether underlying structures, such as bone, tendons or blood vessels, are exposed.

Injuries at the matrix (lunula) or nearer the tip can often be managed with nonadhesive dressings. This generally applies even when bone is exposed and cannot be covered by soft tissue. Rarely should bone be shortened. Antibiotics are generally not needed. Larger injuries may require replantation.

== Prognosis ==
A healed fingertip amputation

To fully heal may take up to six weeks. A hook nail may form. Other complications may include infection, or abnormal sensation. Children generally heal particularly well.

== Epidemiology ==
Fingertip amputations are relatively common injuries, with the highest incidence occurring in children under five years of age and adults in manual occupations.
