= Onychoatrophy =

- Other names: Nail atrophy
- Specialty: Dermatology

Onychoatrophy, also known as nail atrophy, is a faulty underdevelopment of the nail that may be congenital or acquired, in which the nail is thinned and smaller.
