= Nail plate =

Nail plate can refer to:

- Nail (anatomy), a keratin plate at the end of fingers and toes
- Nail-header, a tool for working heads onto metal nails
- Nailing plate, metal sheet with nails or holes for nails used to connect roof trusses
