= Deaf peddlers =

People who sell items in public

An American manual alphabet card, 2013

Deaf peddlers are people who sell to the wider public manual alphabet cards, keychains, nail clippers, pencils and pens, national flags, or receipts in various amounts, which they have printed themselves. In this peddling, the sellers claim that they are deaf, to manipulate or put pressure on the buyer. Most "Deaf" peddlers fake their deafness in order to trick people.

== United States ==
In the United States, the National Association of the Deaf made a campaign against Deaf peddlers, for improving the status of Deaf people as American citizens who are able in body and in mind.
