= Hook nail =

- Other names: Hook nail deformity
- A hook nail deformity after a type II fingertip amputation
- Specialty: Dermatology

Hook nail is a bowing of the nail bed due to a lack of support from the short bony phalanx (fingertip).

== Signs and symptoms ==
The nail plate has volar concavity and a longitudinal hypercurvature. The patient may report discomfort, aesthetic impairment, and functional disability.

== Causes ==
Type II fingertip amputation that later lead to a hook nail

Hook nail is caused by trauma to the hyponychium. Hook nail is often seen after a fingertip amputation.

== Prevention ==
Some publications propose shortening the nail bed to the end of the bony support if it continues past the limit of the severed distal phalanx in order to prevent deformity. Treatments intended to preserve length, such as replantation or flap reconstruction, should be used if the damage to the bone and soft tissue beneath the nail bed is too great.

== Treatment ==
Surgical options for hook-nail deformity include nail excision or finger shortening; alternatively, soft tissue reconstruction, bone grafting, nail recession, or partial toe transfer may be used to try to add some support to the nail bed.

== See also ==
- Half and half nails
- List of cutaneous conditions
