= Eponychium =

Thickened layer of skin at the base of the fingernails and toenails

- Nail anatomy, with eponychium labeled as "nail fold".

- Longitudinal section through nail and its nail groove (sulcus).

Details

Identifiers
- Latin: eponychium
- TA98: A16.0.01.010
- TA2: 7072
- FMA: 77859

The eponychium is the thickened layer of skin at the base of the fingernails and toenails. It can also be called the medial or proximal nail fold. Its function is to protect the area between the nail and epidermis from exposure to bacteria. The vascularization pattern is similar to that of perionychium. The eponychium differs from the cuticle – the eponychium is made up of live skin cells whilst the cuticle is dead skin cells.

In hoofed animals, the eponychium is the deciduous hoof capsule in fetuses and newborn foals, and is a part of the permanent hoof in older animals.

== Terminology ==
The word eponychium comes from Greek ἐπί (epí) 'on top of' and ὀνῠ́χιον (onúkhion) 'little claw'.

== See also ==
- Hyponychium
- Lunula
