= Lichen spinulosus =

- Other names: Keratosis spinulosa
- Specialty: Dermatology

Lichen spinulosus is a rare skin disorder characterized by follicular keratotic papules that are grouped into large patches. It is a variant of keratosis pilaris named for its resemblance to a patch of lichen.

== Signs and symptoms ==
It appears as a cluster of keratotic spines that resemble sandpaper and 2–5 cm hypopigmented or skin-colored follicular papules. The lesions typically appear on different parts of the skin and last for a few weeks or months.

== Causes ==
It could be inherited or linked to substances like gold, arsphenamine, thallium, vitamin A deficiency, diphtheria toxin, atopy, lithium medication, Hodgkin's disease, Crohn's disease, HIV, or alcoholism.

== Diagnosis ==
The histologic observations reveal a dermal lymphohistiocytic infiltration focused around hair follicles.

== Treatment ==
Treatments include topical keratolytics and emollients such as urea, adapalene, salicylic acid, vitamin A, tretinoin, and tacalcitol.

== See also ==
- Hook nail
- List of cutaneous conditions
