= List of medical abbreviations: U =

Abbreviation	Meaning
U_{OSM}	urine osmolality
UA	urinalysis unstable angina
U/A	upon arrival
UAE	Uterine Artery Embolization (synonym for Uterine Fibroid Embolization)
UBT	urea breath test
UC	ulcerative colitis uterine contraction
UCHD	usual childhood diseases (see list of childhood diseases)
UCTD	Undifferentiated connective tissue disease
UCx	Urine culture
UD	as directed (from Latin ut dictum)
UDS	undifferentiated sarcoma
UDS	urine drug screening
UDS	urodynamic study
UDT	urine drug test undescended testis
UE	upper extremity
U&E	urea and electrolytes (blood test) (for sodium and potassium, and often creatinine)
UFE	Uterine Fibroid Embolization
UIP	usual interstitial pneumonitis
UGI	upper gastrointestinal
ULN	upper limit of normal
UMN	upper motor neuron
UNOS	United Network for Organ Sharing
UOP, UO, U/O	urinary output
Ung, ungt	ointment (from Latin unguentum)
Unk	unknown
UPJ	ureteropelvic junction (see pyeloplasty)
UPO	until proven otherwise
UPT	urine pregnancy test
URA	unilateral renal agenesis
URI	upper respiratory infection
URS	Ureteroscopy
URTI	upper respiratory tract infection
US	ultrasonogram
USA	unstable angina
USG	ultrasonogram
USO	unilateral salpingo-oophorectomy
USOH	usual state of health
USP	United States Pharmacopeia
USR	unheated serum reagin
USS	ultrasound scan
UTI	urinary tract infection
UUS	upper uterine segment
UVAL	ultraviolet argon laser
