= Maternal autoimmune bullous disease =

- Specialty: Dermatology

Maternal autoimmune bullous disease is a blistering skin condition that presents at birth.

== See also ==
- Accessory nail of the fifth toe
- List of cutaneous conditions
