= Nail fold =

Nail fold or nailfold may refer to:

- Eponychium, a proximal nail fold
- Paronychium, a lateral nail fold
