= Onychogryphosis =

Onychogryposis
- Other names: Onychogryposis or Ram's horn nails
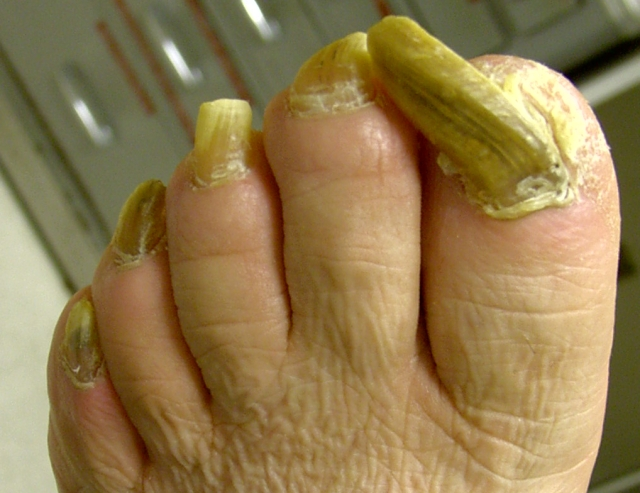
- Specialty: Dermatology

Onychogryphosis is a hypertrophy that may produce nails resembling claws or a ram's horn.

== Causes ==
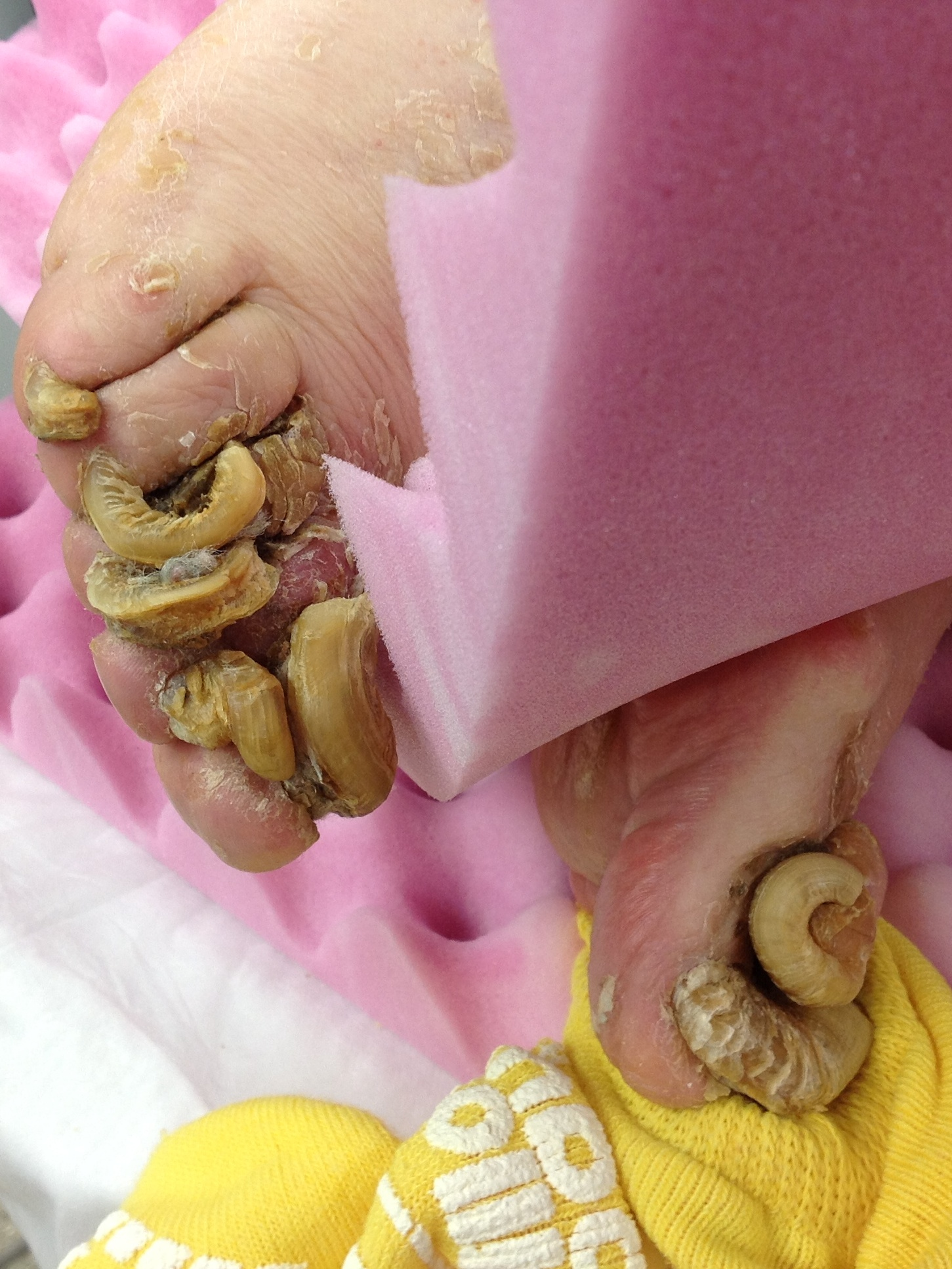
Onychogryphosis demonstrating the characteristic ram's horn appearance

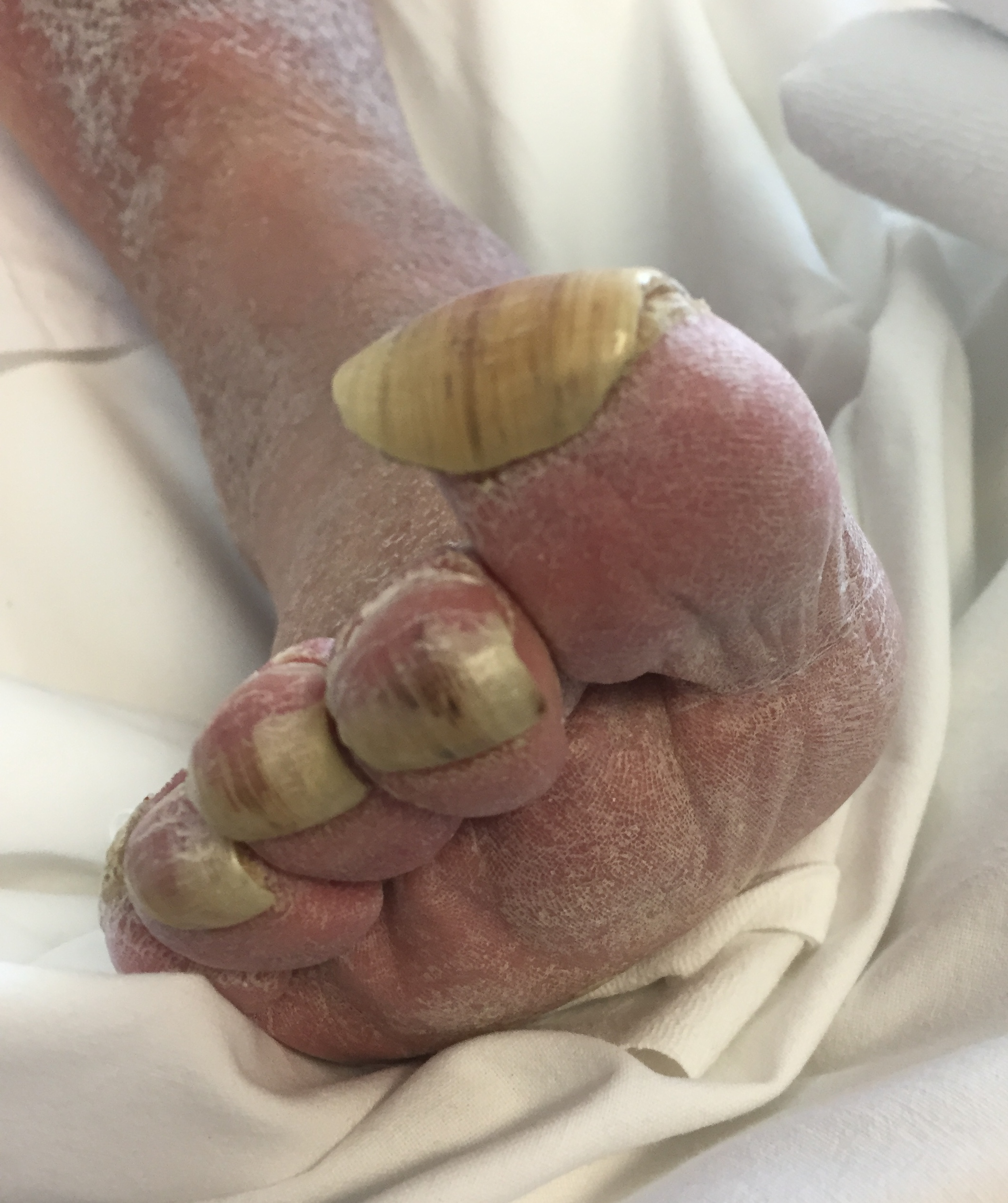
Ram's horn toenails on a bedridden patient

Onychogryphosis may be caused by trauma or peripheral vascular disease, but most often secondary to self-neglect and failure to cut the nails for extended periods of time. This condition is most commonly seen in the elderly.

== Treatment ==
Some recommend avulsion of the nail plate with surgical destruction of the nail matrix with phenol or the carbon dioxide laser, if the blood supply is adequate.

== Epidemiology ==
Severe congenital onychogryphosis affecting all twenty nailbeds has been recorded in two families who exhibit the dominant allele for a certain gene.

Congenital onychogryphosis of the fifth toe (the baby, little, pinky or small toe) is fairly common, but asymptomatic and seldom brought to the attention of medical professionals. Rather, it is brought to the attention of manicurists who routinely file the clawed toenail flat.

== See also ==
- List of cutaneous conditions
