= Undifferentiated connective tissue disease =

Auto-immune disease

- Other names: latent lupus, incomplete lupus
- Specialty: Immunology, rheumatology
- Symptoms: dry eyes, dry mouth, hair loss, joint inflammation, joint pain, mouth ulcers, positive ANA test, Raynaud's phenomenon, sun-sensitive rash

Undifferentiated connective tissue disease (UCTD) (also known as latent lupus or incomplete lupus) is a disease in which the connective tissues are targeted by the immune system. It is a serological and clinical manifestation of an autoimmune disease. When there is proof of an autoimmune disease, but the disease does not correspond to any specific autoimmune disease (such as systemic lupus erythematosus (SLE), scleroderma, mixed connective tissue disease, Sjögren syndrome, systemic sclerosis, polymyositis, dermatomyositis, or rheumatoid arthritis), it will be diagnosed as UCTD. This is also the case of major rheumatic diseases whose early phase was defined by LeRoy et al in 1980 as undifferentiated connective tissue disease.

The term is sometimes used interchangeably with mixed connective tissue disease (MCTD), as it is an overlap syndrome. However, some researchers believe that MCTD is a clinically distinct entity and is strongly associated with the presence of titer high in antibodies Ribonucleoproteins (RNP).

It is estimated that up to 25% of people with systemic autoimmune disease could be considered to have UCTD.

There are many people who have features of connective tissue disease, such as blood test results and external characteristics, but do not fulfill the diagnostic criteria established for any one disease. These people are considered to have undifferentiated connective tissue disease (UCTD).

== Classification ==
UCTD is not specifically included in the WHOs ICD-11 disease classification system, but may be included in the 'diseases of the immune system' group.

== Signs and symptoms ==
The presentation of the disease varies considerably from one patient to another.

Generally, the symptoms include nonspecific symptoms common to connective tissue diseases such as

- fatigue – this is common in autoimmune diseases, and is the patient's primary concern
- malaise
- fever

These can be the initial presentation for some patients.

Other symptoms associated with UCTD include :

- joint pain – the most common symptom, occurring in up to 86% of patients. The pain is often an aching or arthritis-like pain in the elbows, wrists, hands, and knees, in a symmetrical pattern.
- dry eyes
- dry mouth
- hair loss
- joint inflammation
- mouth ulcers
- Raynaud's phenomenon
- sun-sensitive rash

Clinical presentation in some people diagnosed with UCTD may show :

- positive antinuclear antibody (ANA) test. Patients with UCTD usually have positive ANA.
- a decrease in the number of white blood cells
- anemia
- abnormal nerve sensations in the extremities
- inflammation of the lining of the heart and/or lungs
- a decrease in platelet count

Pulmonary involvement, such as nonspecific interstitial pneumonia, can be a complication of the disease.

== Mechanism ==
UCTD is caused by genetic and environmental factors. It may be triggered by factors such as:

- Exposure to harmful products such as cigarette smoke.
- Exposure to an atmospheric pollutant, primary air pollutants (nitrogen oxides [NOx], sulfur dioxide [SO2], volatile organic compounds [VOCs], hydrocarbons and certain metals [such as lead or cadmium]) or secondary (created in the atmosphere through chemical reactions between pollutants).
- Exposure to UV light.

=== T-cell hypothesis ===
Populations of regulatory T cells are believed to be responsible for the onset of the disease. When there is a decline of these cells, manifestations of diseases begin to appear, giving an idea of the vital role of these cells in the prevention of autoimmune diseases. Moreover, an additional decrease could, unfortunately, worsen the pathological state and lead to the differentiation of an undifferentiated connective tissue disease into a differentiated connective tissue disease with a poorer prognosis. Due to the wide range of variation in the inclusion criteria of the disease, up to 50% of patients diagnosed with connective tissue disease may have undifferentiated disease of the underlying connective tissue.

== Diagnosis and research inclusion ==
=== Diagnosis ===
There are no formal diagnostic criteria for UCTD. It is determined via differential diagnosis. Diagnostic tests are undertaken to determine whether a patient has a disease assured or undifferentiated of the connective tissues.

Patients with UCTD usually have positive ANA (antinuclear antibody), and raised ESR (erythrocyte sedimentation rate) values, without typical autoantibody specificities. Some 20% of the general population, and up to 15% of completely healthy people, test positive for ANA, but this is regarded by some as almost always a sign of an autoimmune disorder. If more specific types of ANAs or other proteins are present, other autoimmune conditions (not UCTD) are implied.

Other mechanisms that may be used are tests for anti-histone antibodies, Chromatin and vitamin D, and chest X-ray to show signs of pericardial effusion.

=== Classification criteria ===
Patients may be included for UCTD research if they have:

- Signs and symptoms which (a) are suggestive of a connective tissue disease, but (b) do not meet the criteria of any defined connective tissue diseases, and (c) have lasted for at least three years. (Note, if less than three years, may be regarded as early UCTD).
- A positive ANA test on two different occasions.

== Treatment ==
UCTD is normally managed primarily in the outpatient setting. Medications can be used to manage aspects of the disease.

Early recognition and knowledge of the onset of UCTD can help patients manage and control their disease. Patients should be informed of common agents and triggers to help manage symptoms, to shorten the duration of the disease, and prevent complications.

Treatment depends largely on the progression of the individual disease and the nature of the symptoms presented. Antimalarial medications, corticosteroids and other medications may be prescribed, as the treating physician considers appropriate:

- Nonsteroidal anti-inflammatory drugs for pain.
- Anti-inflammatory corticosteroids
- Immunosuppressive drugs, in severe cases
- Antimalarial medications (like hydroxychloroquine) can inhibit chemotaxis of neutrophils and eosinophils.
- Calcium channel blockers can be used to relax smooth muscles and decrease the resistance of the peripheral vascular system. This can help in managing Raynaud's phenomenon.

=== Possible complications ===
Complications are possible for affected or injured organs and systems, such as lesions and long-term inflammation in the pulmonary system, interstitial lung disease (in 88% of cases, severe interstitial lung disease) or pulmonary fibrosis. If the heart is affected, hypertrophy can occur, leading to cardiomegaly. Neurological or renal manifestations and life-threatening conditions can also occur.

Affected pregnant women should follow careful clinical observation because they are more likely to see disease progression. Those with the disease at the beginning of pregnancy will keep the disease undifferentiated against 25% who progress to a defined disease at the end of pregnancy. In addition, 45% of pregnancies with the disease end in preterm birth.

== Outlook ==
=== Progression ===
30–40% of UCTD cases may develop into a defined connective tissue disease as more diagnostic criteria are progressively met. This generally happens within five years of onset.

Several factors may help predict progression:

- The presence of cytopenia at the time of diagnosis.
- The degree of modification of the capillaroscopy test (skin blood vessel study technique) of nail fold during follow-up.
- The presence of antinuclear antibodies.
- Young age.
- Severe vitamin D deficiency.
- The presence of anti-dsDNA, anti-Sm, and anti-cardiolipin autoantibodies correlates with the development of systemic lupus erythematosus in particular.

The rate of progression is higher in the first five years following the onset of the disease and tends to decrease over time. Patients progressing to a defined disease seem to see a slight progression of the disease with a mitigated risk of developing complications.

=== Remaining undifferentiated ===
Most UCTD cases will remain undifferentiated. UCTD itself usually has a mild clinical course, particularly if there is low organ involvement. Most patients who remain undifferentiated tend not to experience major organ involvement.

Up to 10–20% of patients diagnosed with UCTD will never progress to a defined disease, and their symptoms will decrease or disappear.

About 12% of patients will go into remission.

=== Particular studies ===
- In a Bulgarian study, after five years, 34% of the subjects' UCTD had developed into a defined connective tissue disease (with the highest probability of development being within the first two years after onset of symptoms), 54% continued as undifferentiated, and 12% were in remission.
- In a US study, after 10 years, 37% had developed into a defined connective tissue disease, 43% continued undifferentiated, and 20% were in remission.
- In a Spanish study, after a mean follow-up of 11±3 years, 14% had developed a definite CTD, 62% continued undifferentiated, and 24% were in remission.
- In an Italian study (in which 58% had ANA abnormalities), after five years, 6% had developed a defined autoimmune disease. The remaining 94% saw clinical and serological features little changed in the period and quite stable. 11% of these were and remained asymptomatic.

== Epidemiology ==
Up to 90% of UCTD cases are females between 32 and 44 years old. In the United States, up to 78% of patients were female, against 93 to 95% in Italy and 94% in Hungary. Higher female prevalence is common in autoimmune diseases.

In the United States, up to 72% of patients diagnosed with UCTD had white skin.

The prevalence of UCTD has been estimated at 2 people per 100,000 per year. Annual incidence has been estimated as varying from 41 to 149 per 100,000 adults. It has also been suggested that UCTD is a relatively common condition seen in rheumatology practice, making up 10–20% of referrals to tertiary care clinics.

Classical epidemiological data for UCTD are not available due to the limited literature exploring the disease. Additionally, differences in patient selection criteria in existing studies make comparisons between them difficult.

== History ==
The term was first suggested in 1980 as a connective tissue disease in patients whose features did not meet other classification criteria. In 1999, a study noted, "In recent years, there has been growing concern regarding the diagnosis of incomplete forms of the autoimmune diseases"; the first classification criteria were proposed in that same year.

Historically, the condition has sometimes been called undifferentiated connective tissue syndrome, latent lupus, or incomplete lupus.
