= Onychophosis =

- Specialty: Dermatology

Onychophosis is a localized or diffuse hyperkeratotic tissue that develops on the lateral or proximal nailfolds, within the space between the nailfolds and the nail plate, and is a common finding in the elderly. Onychophosis may involve the subungual area, as a direct result of repeated minor trauma, and most frequently affects the first and fifth toe.
