= Salim Haim =

- Born: Salim Haim; 1919; Baghdad
- Died: 1983 (aged 63–64); Haifa, Israel
- Occupation: dermatologist
- Known for: Haim–Munk syndrome

Salim Haim (1919–1983) was a dermatologist. In 1965 he described for the first time a case of Haim–Munk syndrome.

== See also ==
- Haim–Munk syndrome
