= Oh, Dem Golden Slippers =

Minstrel song written by James E. Bland in 1879

"Oh, Dem Golden Slippers" is a minstrel song penned by African-American James A. Bland in 1879, particularly well known as a bluegrass instrumental standard. By 1880, the song had exceeded 100,000 copies sold.

== Overview ==
A minstrel show song set in the style of a spiritual, the song is apparently a parody of the spiritual "Golden Slippers", popularized after the American Civil War by the Fisk Jubilee Singers. Today "Oh, Dem Golden Slippers" is often referred to simply as "Golden Slippers", further obscuring the original spiritual.

The song's first stanza tells of the protagonist setting aside such fine clothes as golden slippers, a long-tailed coat and a white robe for a chariot ride in the morning (presumably to Heaven). This leads to the refrain: Oh, dem golden slippers! / Oh, dem golden slippers! / Golden slippers I'm gwine to wear, becase dey look so neat; / Oh, dem golden slippers! / Oh, dem golden slippers! / Golden slippers Ise gwine to wear, / To walk de golden street.

The second stanza describes the protagonist meeting up with other family members after his chariot ride. In the third, the protagonist tells children to prepare themselves for their own chariot ride.
