= Foal =

Horse of either sex up to the age of one year

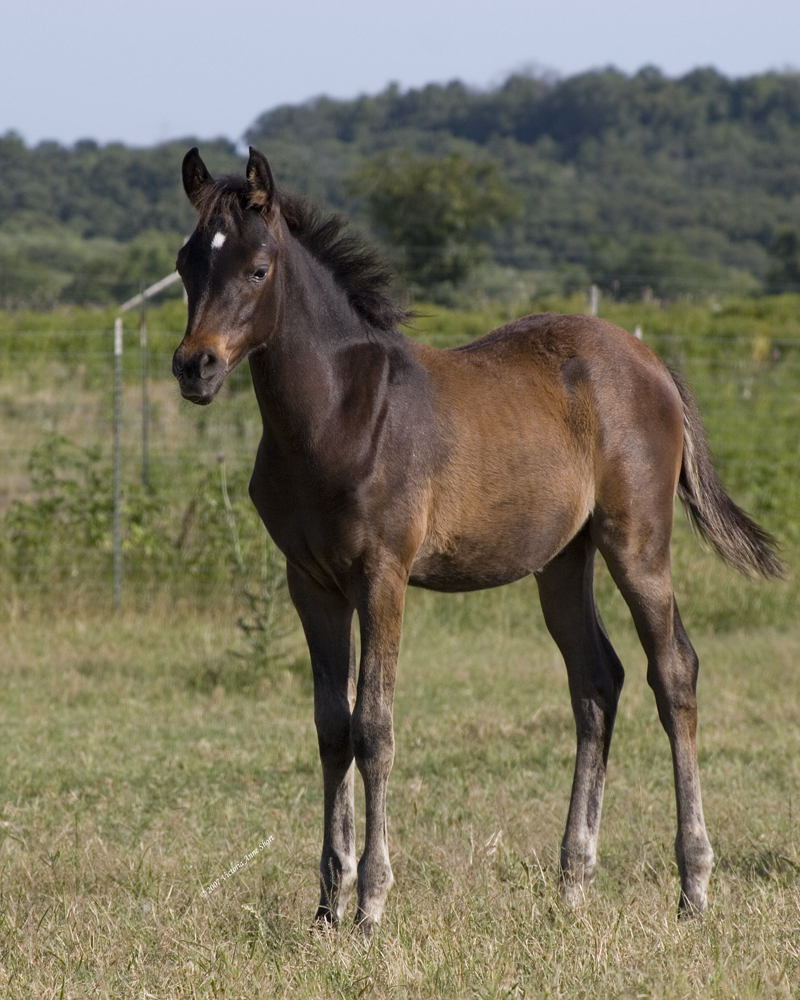
A foal at about weaning age

A foal is an equine up to one year old; this term is used mainly for horses, but can be used for donkeys. More specific terms are colt for a male foal and filly for a female foal, and are used until the horse is three or four. When the foal is nursing from its dam (mother), it may also be called a "suckling". After it has been weaned from its dam, it may be called a "weanling". When a mare is pregnant, she is said to be "in foal". When the mare gives birth, she is "foaling", and the impending birth is usually stated as "to foal". A newborn horse is "foaled".

After a horse is one year old, it is no longer a foal, and is a "yearling". There are no special age-related terms for young horses older than yearlings. When young horses reach breeding maturity, the terms change: a filly over three (four in horse racing) is called a mare, and a colt over three is called a stallion. A castrated male horse is called a gelding regardless of age; however, colloquially, the term "gelding colt" is sometimes used until a young gelding is three or four. (There is no specific term for a spayed mare other than a "spayed mare".)

Horses that mature at a small stature are called ponies and occasionally confused with foals. However, body proportions are very different. An adult pony can be ridden and put to work, but a foal, regardless of stature, is too young to be ridden or used as a working animal. Foals, whether they grow up to be horse or pony-sized, can be distinguished from adult horses by their extremely long legs and small, slim bodies. Their heads and eyes also exhibit juvenile characteristics. Although ponies exhibit some neoteny with the wide foreheads and small stature, their body proportions are similar to that of an adult horse. Pony foals are proportionally smaller than adults, but like horse foals, they are slimmer and have proportionally longer legs.

== Early development ==
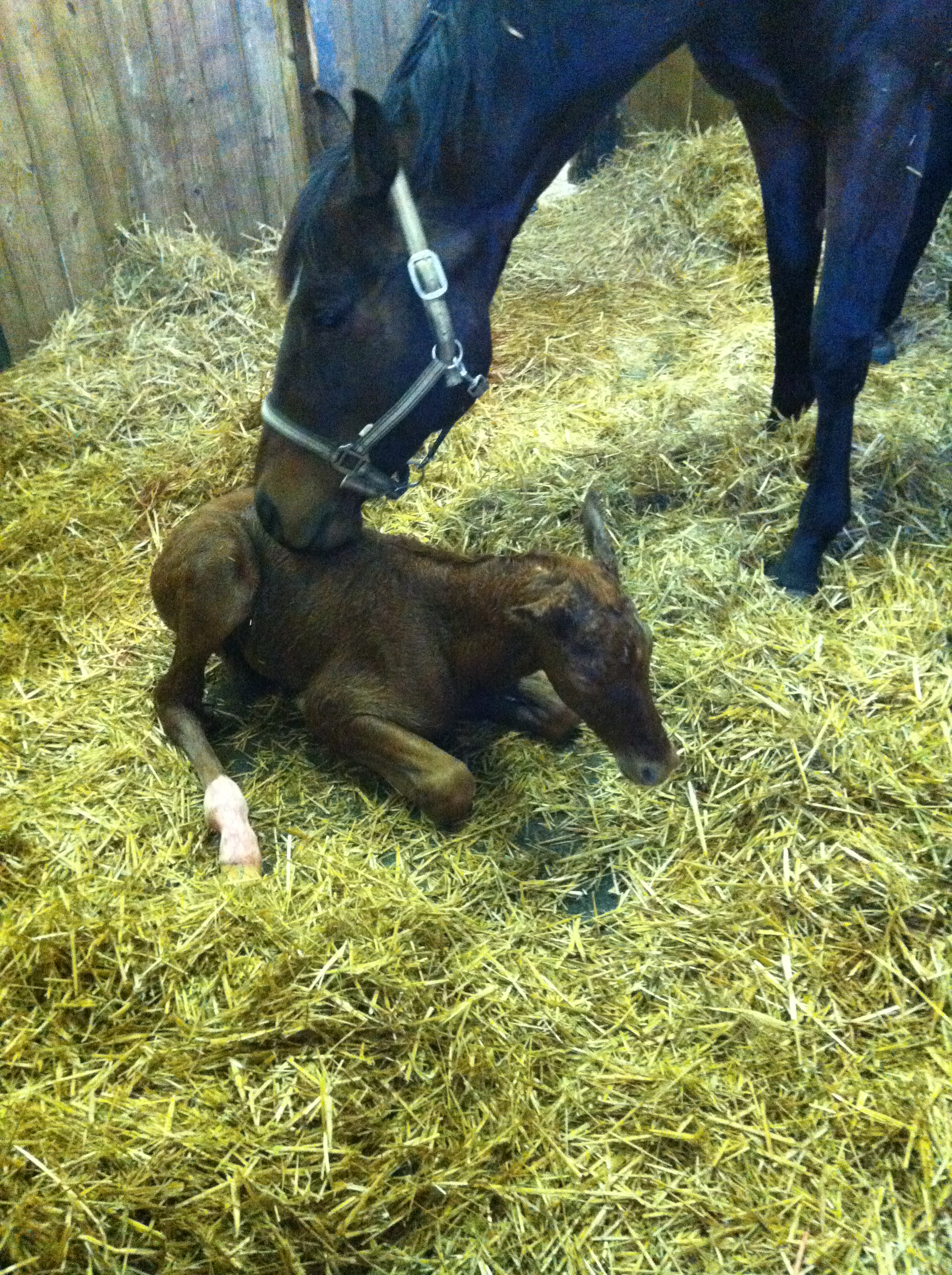
A newborn foal

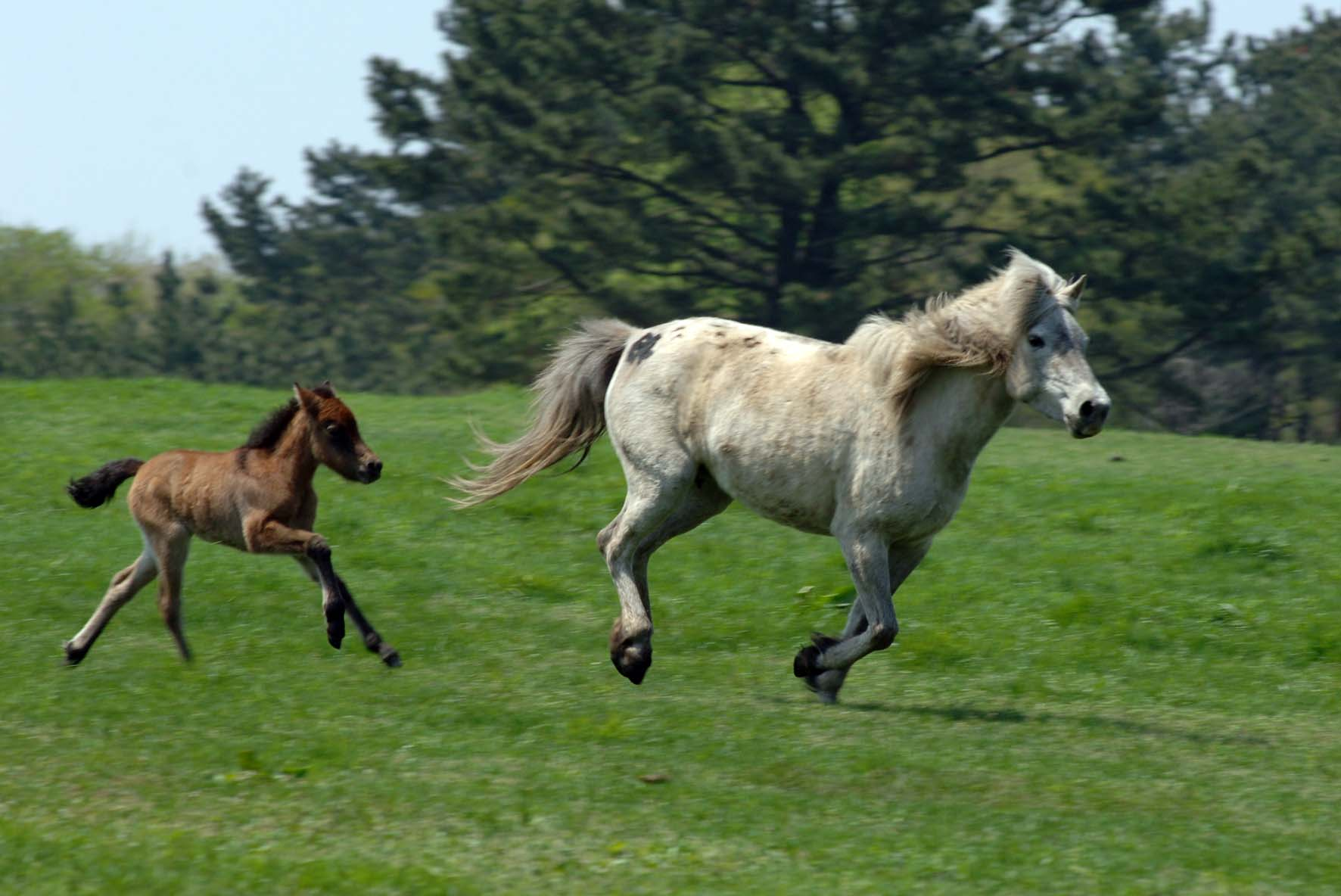
A foal will be able to run alongside of its dam within a few hours of birth.

Foals are born after a gestation period of approximately 11 months. Birth takes place quickly, consistent with the status of a horse as a prey animal, and more often at night than during the day. Labor lasting over twenty-four hours may be a sign of medical complications. Unlike most predators which are altricial (born helpless), horses are precocial, meaning they come into the world relatively mature and mobile. Healthy foals can typically keep up with the rest of the herd only a few hours after birth. If a foal has not eaten within twelve hours, it may require assistance.

Healthy foals grow quickly and can put on up to three pounds or over a kilo a day. A sound diet improves growth and leads to a healthier adult animal, although genetics also plays a part. In the first weeks of life the foal gets everything it needs from the mare's milk. Like a human infant, it receives nourishment and antibodies from the colostrum in milk that is produced within the first few hours or days following parturition. The mare needs additional water to help her produce milk for the foal and may benefit from supplementary nutrition.

A foal may start to eat solids from ten days of age. After eight to ten weeks it will need more nutrition than the mare's milk can supply, requiring supplementary nourishment. It is important when adding solid food to the foal's diet to not feed the foal excessively or feed an improperly balanced diet. This can trigger one of several possible growth disorders that can cause lifelong soundness problems. On the other hand, insufficient nutrition to mare or foal can cause stunted growth and other health problems for the foal as it gets older.

== Weaning and maturity ==
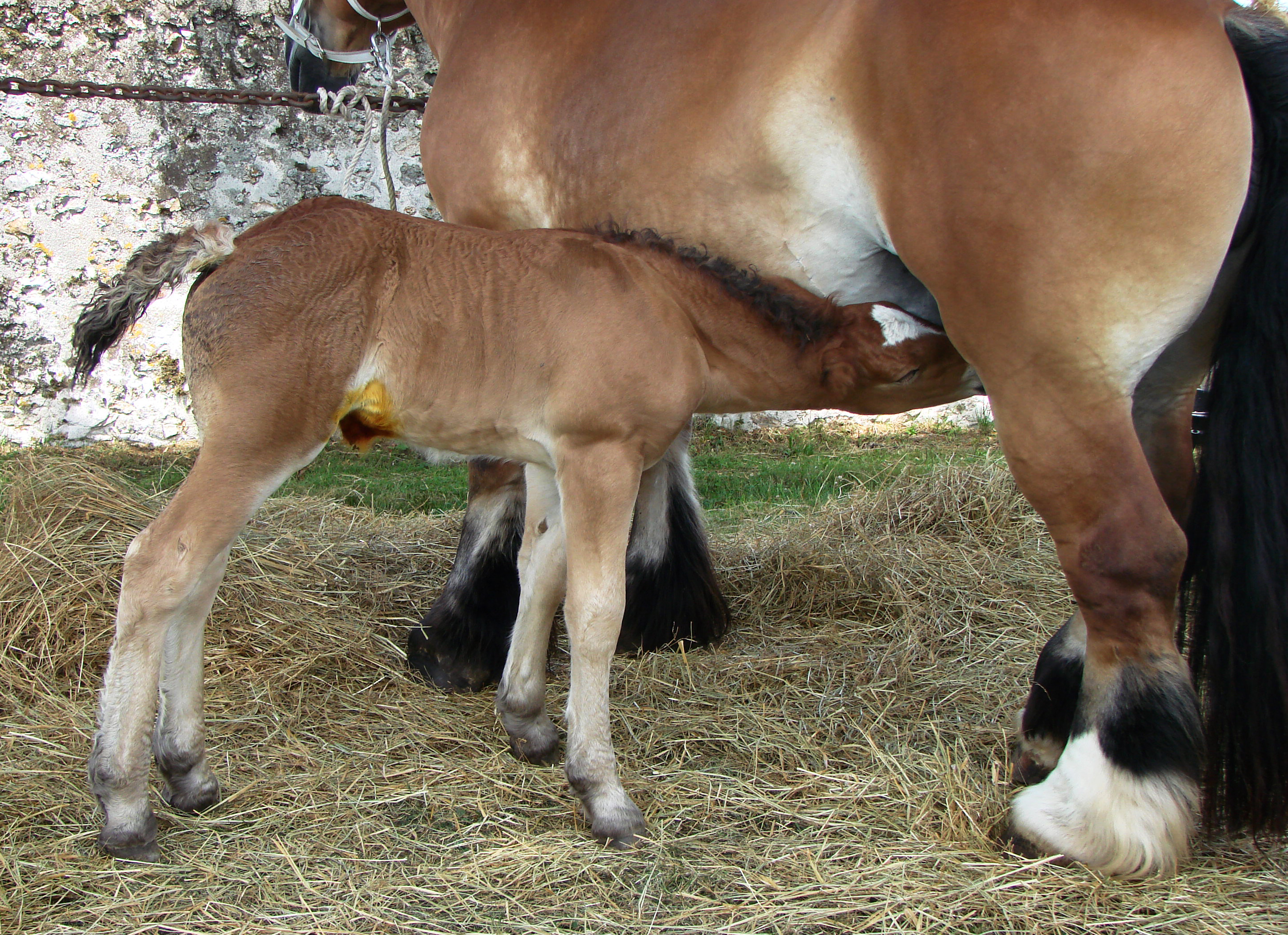
A foal will nurse for at least four months before being weaned when under human management, and have been known to nurse for up to a year in the wild.

It is typical for foals under human management to be weaned between four and six months of age, though under natural conditions, they may nurse for longer, occasionally until the following year when the mare foals again. Some foals can nurse for up to three years in domesticity because the mare is less likely to conceive another foetus. A foal that has been weaned but is less than one year old is called a weanling.

Mare's milk is not a significant source of nutrients for the foal after about four months, though it does no harm to a healthy mare for a foal to nurse longer and may be of some psychological benefit to the foal. A mare that is both nursing and pregnant will have increased nutritional demands made upon her in the last months of pregnancy, and therefore most domesticated foals are weaned sometime in the autumn in the Northern Hemisphere if the mare is to be bred again the next season.

Weanlings are not capable of reproduction. Puberty occurs in most horses during their yearling year. Therefore, some young horses are capable of reproduction prior to full physical maturity, though it is not common. Two-year-olds sometimes are deliberately bred, though doing so, particularly with fillies, puts undesirable stress on their still-growing bodies. As a general rule, breeding young horses prior to the age of three is considered undesirable.

== Early training ==
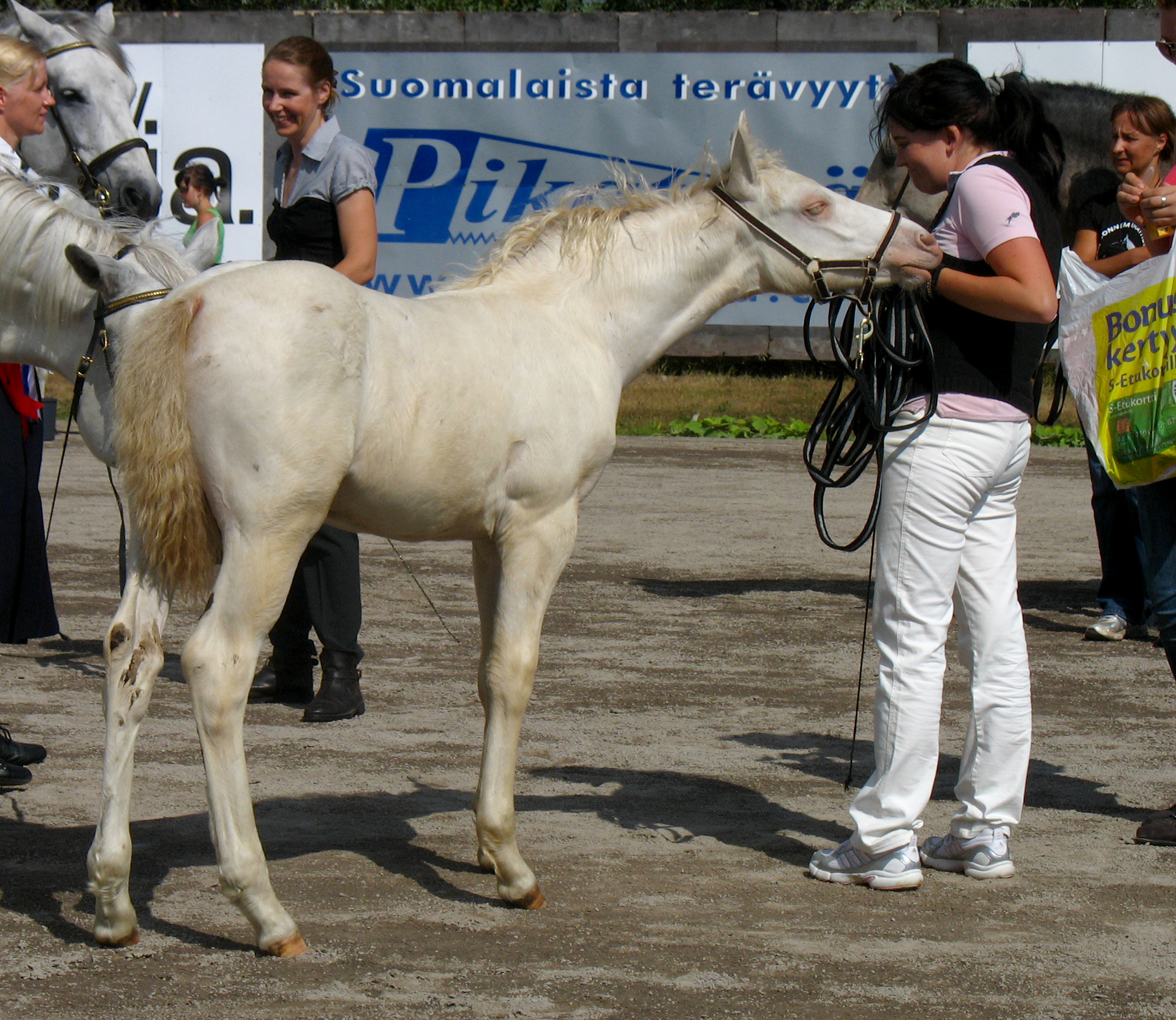
Foals should be taught to lead

In spite of rapid growth, a foal is too young to be ridden or driven. However, foals usually receive very basic horse training in the form of being taught to accept being led by humans, called halter-breaking. They may also learn to accept horse grooming, hoof trimming by a farrier, having hair trimmed with electric clippers, and to become familiar with things it will have to do throughout life, such as loading into a horse trailer or wearing a horse blanket. Horses in general have excellent memories, so a foal must not be taught anything as a young horse that would be undesirable for it to do as a full-grown animal.

In either case, foals that have not bonded to their mothers will have difficulty in pasture. The mare will find it more difficult to teach the foal to follow her. Other horses can have difficulty communicating with the foal and may ostracise it due to speaking a different "language". It can be difficult to lead a foal that has never even been led by its dam.

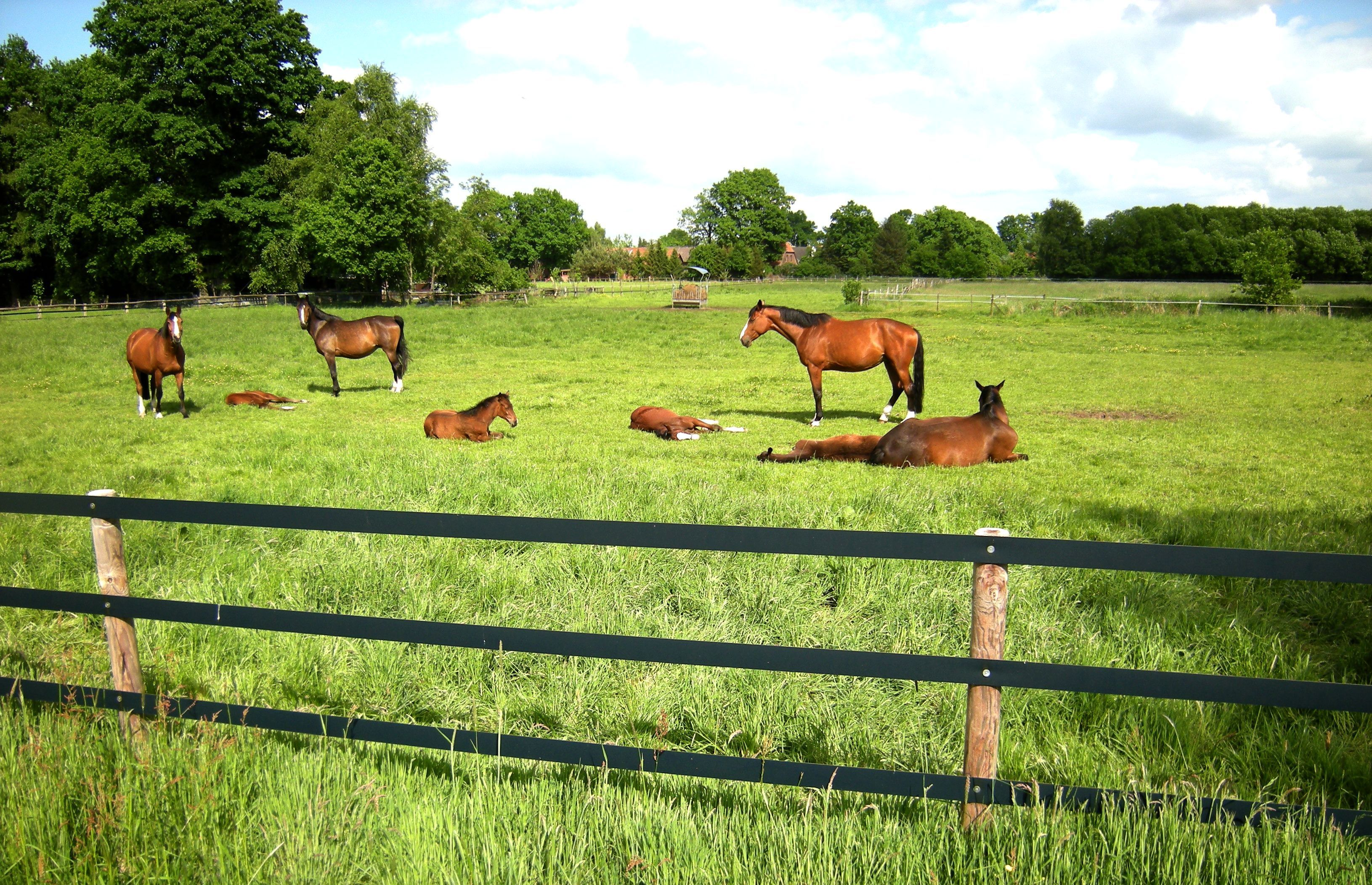
Foals need to lie down more often and rest longer than adult horses.

Horses are not fully mature until the age of four or five, but most are started as working animals much younger, though care must be taken not to over-stress the "soft" bones of younger animals. Yearlings are generally too young to be ridden at all, though many race horses are put under saddle as "long" yearlings, in autumn. Physiologically young horses are still not truly mature as two-year-olds, though some breeders and most race horse trainers do start young horses in a cart or under saddle at that age. The most common age for young horses to begin training under saddle is the age of three. A few breeds and disciplines wait until the animal is four.

== See also ==
- Deciduous hoof capsule
