= Golden Slippers =

"Golden Slippers" is a spiritual popularized in the years following the American Civil War by the Fisk Jubilee Singers. The song is also known by its opening line, "What Kind of Shoes You Gwine (Going) To Wear". The song became the basis for a minstrel show parody song, "Oh, Dem Golden Slippers", which itself became an American musical standard. The parody song is also frequently referred to as "Golden Slippers".

Golden Slippers
1909 recording by the Fisk Jubilee Singers

== Song ==
As presented in its earliest recordings, "Golden Slippers" is a stirring and proud song, considerably different than its rather jaunty parody. In it, the lead singer asks the choir what kind of finery they will wear in going to join the Heavenly choir. The lyrics for the first stanza are:

What kind of shoes you goin’ to wear? / Golden slippers! / What kind of shoes you goin’ to wear? / Golden slippers!

Golden slippers I’m bound to wear, / To outshine the glittering sun. / Oh, yes, yes, yes my Lord, / I’m going to join the Heavenly choir. / Yes, yes, yes my Lord, / Soldier of the cross.

Although there are variations between existing recordings, subsequent stanzas involve a "long white robe" (as in "Oh, Dem Golden Slippers"), a "starry crown", a "new song", and a "golden harp".

Over the first half of the twentieth century, various recordings of the song as "Golden Slippers" were made by the Fisk Jubilee Singers, the Golden Echo Quartet, the Tuskegee Institute (University) Singers, Wood's Famous Blind Jubilee Singers & Cotton Belt Quartet, and the Wiseman Quartet.

As "What Kind Of Shoes You Gwine To Wear", the song was recorded in the late 1920s with a considerably different up-tempo melody and playful arrangement by William Rexroat and his Cedar Crest Singers. As the chorus sings each of the questions and responses, the lead singer interjects a smart-aleck answer before joining with them. (An example: "I'm goin' to wear my old work shoes!" to "What kind of shoes you gwine to wear, golden shoes".)

A performance of this latter arrangement appeared on the 1973 folk album "Lonesome Robin" by Bob Coltman, as "What Kind of Shoes".
