= Deciduous hoof capsule =

Eponychium in newborn hoofed animals

In hoofed animals, the deciduous hoof capsule (Capsula ungulae decidua) is the eponychium in fetuses and newborn foals. It is a deciduous structure, which disappears as the animal grows. In equines, they are shed soon after a foal begins to stand. The shedding process can vary from dropping-off whole to the gradual wearing down of the capsule. Common names used in lay literature include "golden slippers", "fairy fingers", and "horse feathers".
