= Congenital malformations of the dermatoglyphs =

- Specialty: Dermatology

Congenital malformations of the dermatoglyphs are a cutaneous condition divided into four main categories based on the appearance of the dermal ridges of which they are composed: (1) ridge aplasia; (2) ridge hypoplasia; (3) ridge dissociation; and (4) ridges-off-the-end.

== See also ==
- Melanotic neuroectodermal tumor of infancy
- List of cutaneous conditions
