= Choreic hand =

Clinical sign

Choreic hand or spooning is flexion and dorsal arching of the wrists and hyperextension of the fingers when the hands are extended sideways palms down.

Spooning is a recognized clinical sign in pediatric neurology during standard evaluation of the posture with extended arms.

Spooning is common and often observed in children until around the age of 5.

In older ages, it is a clinical sign seen in children with chorea.
