= Hyponychium =

Thickened epithelium underlying the free edge of the nail plate

- Nail anatomy

Details

Identifiers
- Latin: hyponychium
- TA98: A16.0.01.011
- TA2: 7073
- FMA: 77860

The hyponychium (IPA: /ˌhaɪpoʊˈnɪkiəm/) is the area of epithelium, particularly the thickened portion, underlying the free edge of the nail plate on the nail. Its proximal border is immediately distal to distal limit of nail bed—a.k.a. the onychodermal band (the line along the interface of the nail bed and the nail plate). Its distal border the free edge of the nail plate—or where that edge would project downwards onto the epidermis.

It is sometimes called "the quick" (in its archaic meaning of "living"), as in the phrase cut to the quick.

== See also ==
- Eponychium
