= Nail clipper =

Tool for trimming toenails or fingernails

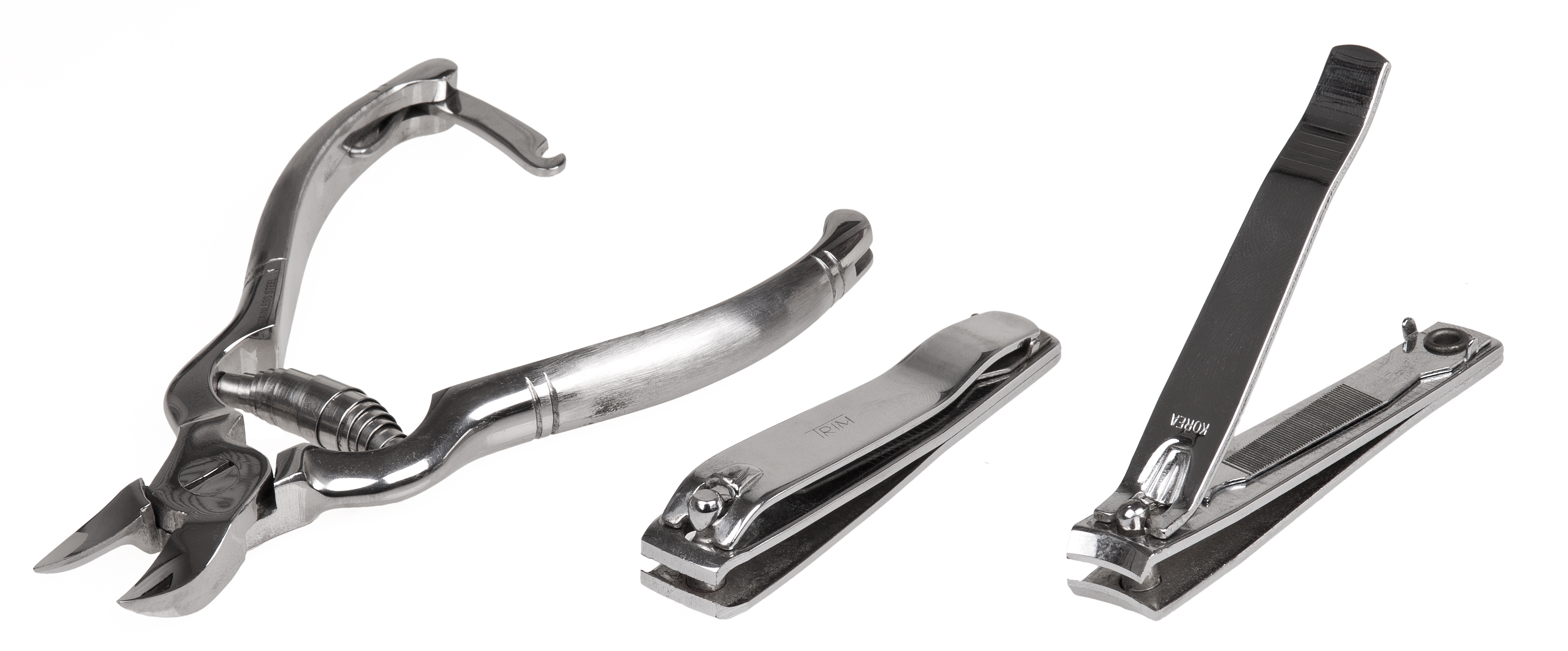
A variety of nail clippers; the clipper on the left is in the plier style; the centre and right clippers are in the compound lever style

A nail clipper (also called nail clippers, a nail trimmer, a nail cutter or nipper type) is a hand tool used to trim nails and hangnails.

== Design ==
Levers of a compound-lever clipper; purple triangles denote the fulcra

Nail clippers are usually made of stainless steel but can also be made of plastic and aluminum. Two common varieties are the pliers type and the compound lever type. Many nail clippers come with a miniature file affixed to them, for manicuring (smoothing) the rough edges of nails, and some come with a nail catcher.

The head of a nail clipper may be either concave or convex. Nail clippers with convex clipping ends are intended for trimming toenails, while concave clipping ends are for fingernails. The cutting head may be manufactured to be parallel or perpendicular to the principal axis of the cutter. Cutting heads that are parallel to the principal axis are made to address accessibility issues involved with cutting toenails.

== History ==
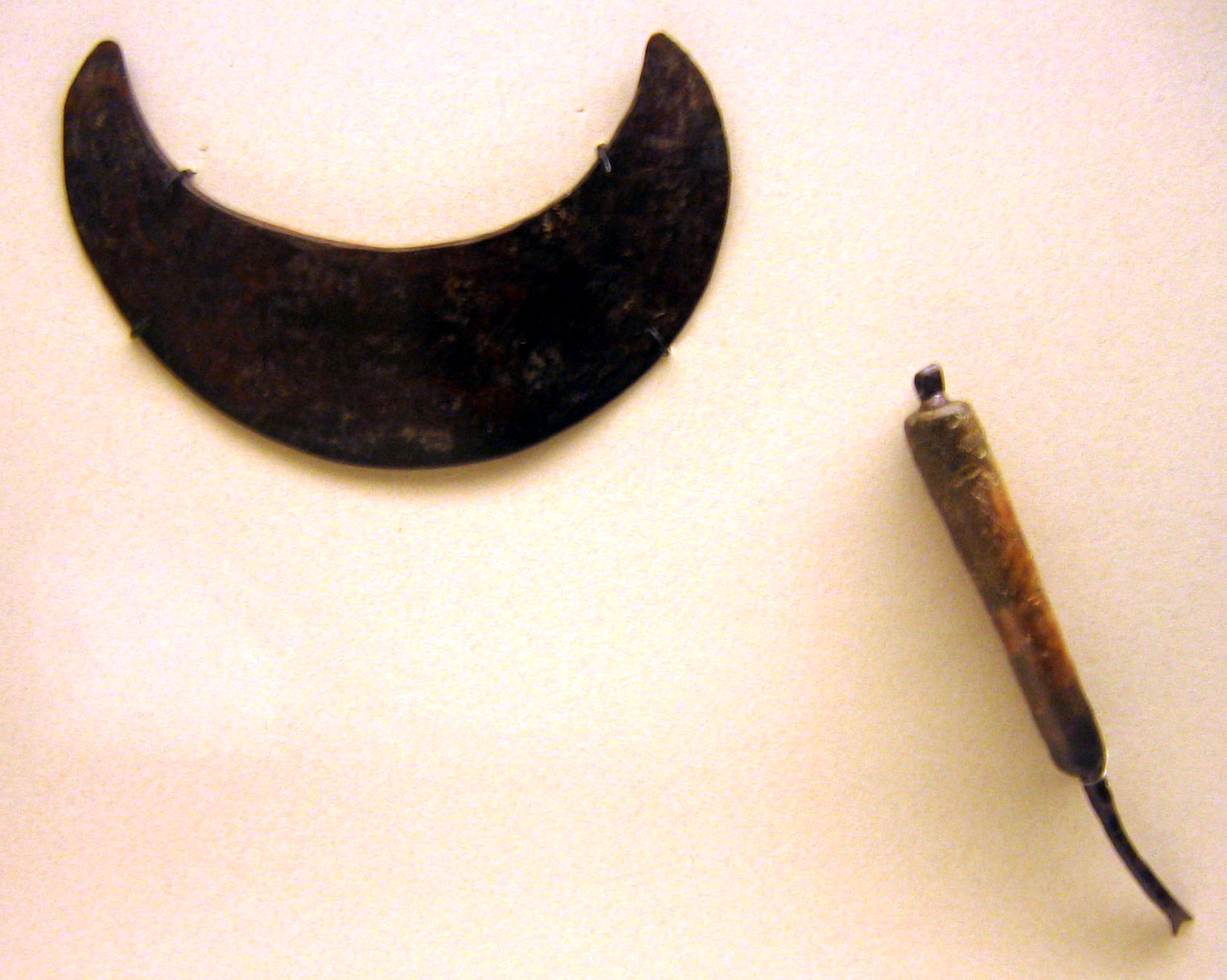
Razor (top) and nail cutter with bone handle (bottom) found in a grave of the Hallstatt culture (c. 6th–8th centuries BC)

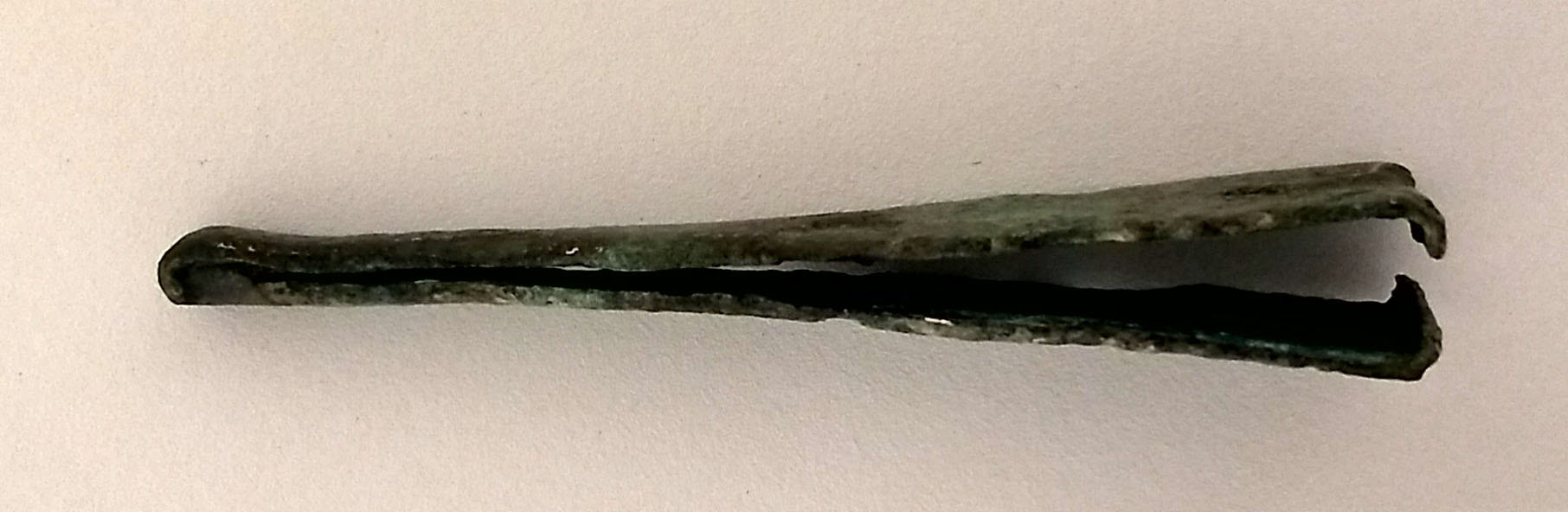
Roman nail clipper made of bronze, 3rd to 4th century AD

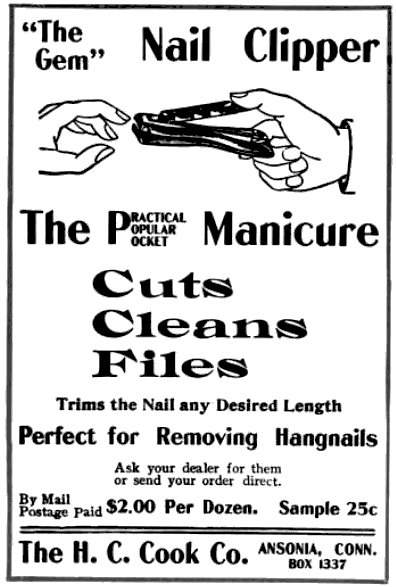
1902 advertisement from Good Housekeeping for Carter's nail cutter, produced by the H. C. Cook Company of Ansonia, Connecticut

Before the invention of the modern nail clipper, people would use small knives to trim or pare their nails. Descriptions of nail trimming in literature date as far back as the 8th century BC. The Book of Deuteronomy exhorts in 21:12 that a man, should he wish to take a captive as a wife, "shall bring her home to [his] house, and she shall shave her head and trim her nails". A reference is made in Horace's Epistles, written circa 20 BC, to "A close-shaven man, it's said, in an empty barber's booth, penknife in hand, quietly cleaning his nails."

The first United States patent for an improvement in fingernail clippers (then dubbed "finger-nail trimmers") was filed in 1875 by Valentine Fogerty. Subsequent patents for improvements in fingernail clippers were filed in 1876, by William C. Edge, and in 1878, by John H. Hollman. Later patent filings for fingernail clippers include: one by Eugene Heim and Celestin Matz in 1881, one in 1885 by George H. Coates (for a "finger-nail cutter"), an 1886 patent by Hungarian Inventor David Gestetner, a 1905 patent by Chapel S. Carter, and another by Chapel S. Carter and Hedley P. Carter in 1922.

Around 1913, Chapel S. Carter was secretary of the H. C. Cook Company in Ansonia, Connecticut, which was incorporated in 1903 as the H. C. Cook Machine Company by Carter, Henry C. Cook, and Lewis I. Cook. Around 1928, when Carter was president of the company, he claimed the "Gem" brand fingernail clipper was introduced in 1896.

In 1947, William E. Bassett (who started the W. E. Bassett Company in 1939) developed the "Trim" brand nail clipper, using the jaw-style design that had been around since the 19th century, but adding two nibs near the base of the file to prevent lateral movement, replacing the pinned rivet with a notched rivet, and adding a thumb-swerve in the lever.

== See also ==
- Cigar cutter
- Dog grooming § Nail clipping
- Manicure
- Pedicure
- Pliers
