= Nail (anatomy) =

Hard keratin protection of digit

Details
- System: Integumentary system

Identifiers
- Latin: unguis
- MeSH: D009262
- TA98: A16.0.01.001
- TA2: 7065
- TH: H3.12.00.3.02001
- FMA: 54326

A nail is a protective plate characteristically found at the tip of the digits (fingers and toes) of almost all primates (except for marmosets), homologous to the claws in other tetrapod animals. Fingernails and toenails are made of a tough rigid protein called alpha-keratin, a polymer also found in the claws, hooves, and horns of vertebrates.

== Structure ==
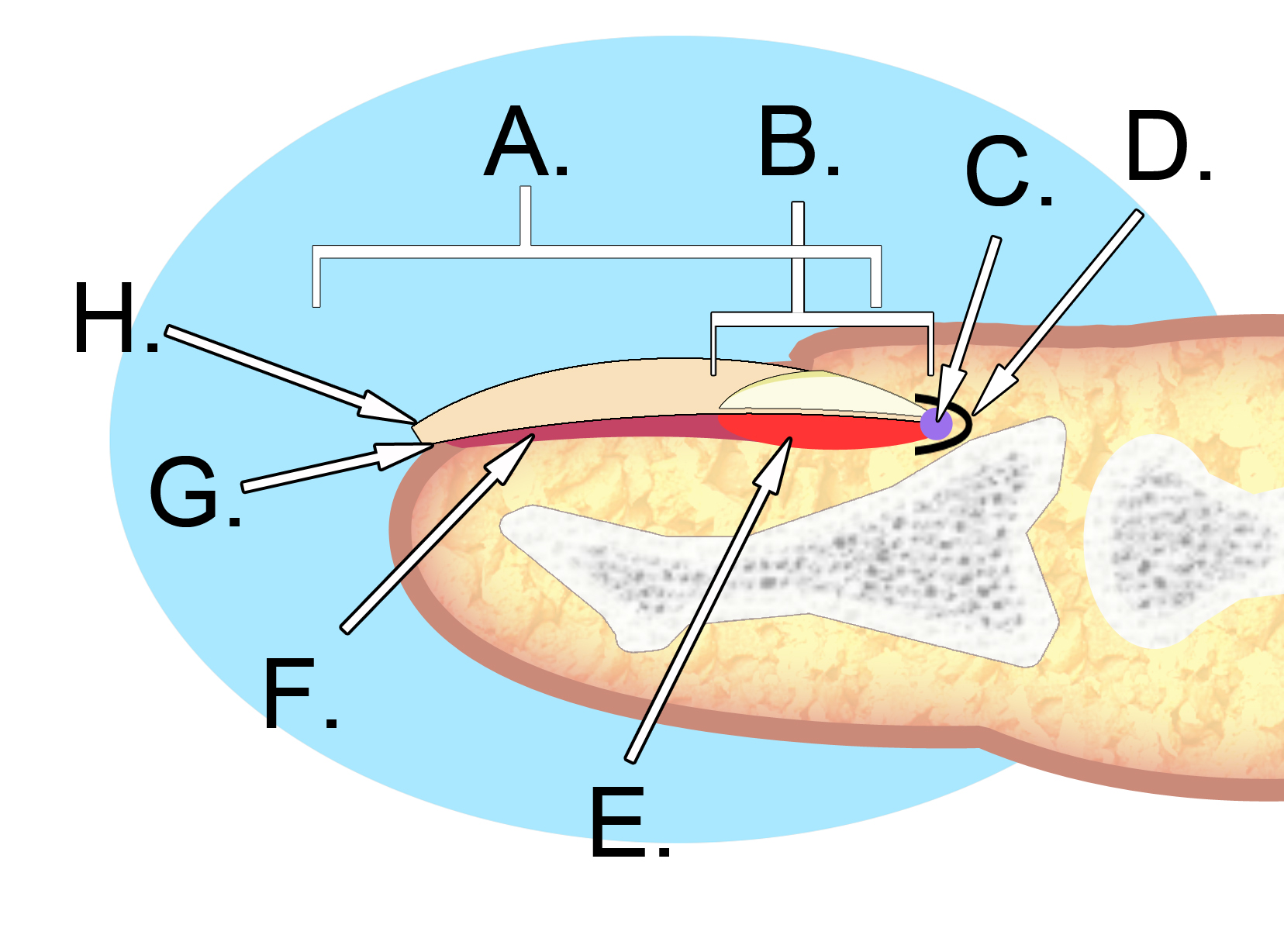
A. Nail plate; B. lunula; C. root; D. sinus; E. matrix; F. nail bed; G. hyponychium; H. free margin

The nail consists of the nail plate, the nail matrix, the nail bed below it, and the grooves surrounding it.

=== Parts of the nail ===
The nail matrix is the active tissue (or germinal matrix) that generates cells. The cells harden as they move outward from the nail root to the nail plate. The nail matrix is also known as the matrix unguis, keratogenous membrane, or onychostroma. It is the part of the nail bed that is beneath the nail and contains nerves, lymph, and blood vessels. The matrix produces cells that become the nail plate. The width and thickness of the nail plate is determined by the size, length, and thickness of the matrix, while the shape of the fingertip bone determines if the nail plate is flat, arched, or hooked. The matrix will continue to produce cells as long as it receives nutrition and remains in a healthy condition. As new nail plate cells are made, they push older nail plate cells forward; and in this way older cells become compressed, flat, and translucent. This makes the capillaries in the nail bed below visible, resulting in a pink color.

The lunula ("small moon") is the visible part of the matrix, the whitish crescent-shaped base of the visible nail. The lunula can best be seen in the thumb and may not be visible in the little finger. The lunula appears white due to a reflection of light at the point where the nail matrix and nail bed meet.

The nail bed is the skin beneath the nail plate. It is the area of the nail on which the nail plate rests. Nerves and blood vessels found here supply nourishment to the entire nail unit. Like all skin, it is made of two types of tissues: the dermis and the epidermis. The epidermis is attached to the dermis by tiny longitudinal "grooves" called matrix crests (cristae matricis unguis). In old age, the nail plate becomes thinner, and these grooves become more visible. The nail bed is highly innervated, and removal of the nail plate is often excruciatingly painful as a result.

The nail sinus (sinus unguis) is where the nail root is; i.e. the base of the nail underneath the skin. It originates from the actively growing tissue below, the matrix.

The nail plate (corpus unguis) sometimes referred to as the nail body, is the visible hard nail area from the nail root to the free edge, made of translucent keratin protein. Several layers of dead, compacted cells cause the nail to be strong but flexible. Its (transverse) shape is determined by the form of the underlying bone. In common usage, the word nail often refers to this part only. The nail plate is strongly attached to the nail bed and does not contain any nerves or blood vessels.

The free margin (margo liber) or distal edge is the anterior margin of the nail plate corresponds to the abrasive or cutting edge of the nail. The hyponychium (informally known as the "quick") is the epithelium located beneath the nail plate at the junction between the free edge and the skin of the fingertip. It forms a seal that protects the nail bed. The onychodermal band is the seal between the nail plate and the hyponychium. It is just under the free edge, in that portion of the nail where the nail bed ends and can be recognized in fair-skinned people by its glassy, greyish colour. It is not visible in some individuals while it is highly prominent on others.

==== Eponychium ====
Together, the eponychium and the cuticle form a protective seal. The cuticle is the semi-circular layer of almost invisible dead skin cells that "ride out on" and cover the back of the visible nail plate. The eponychium is the fold of skin cells that produces the cuticle. They are continuous, and some references view them as one entity. (Thus the names eponychium, cuticle, and perionychium would be synonymous, although a distinction is still drawn here.) It is the cuticle (nonliving part) that is removed during a manicure, but the eponychium (living part) should not be touched due to risk of pain, bleeding, and infection. The eponychium is a small band of living cells (epithelium) that extends from the posterior nail wall onto the base of the nail. The eponychium is the end of the proximal fold that folds back upon itself to shed an epidermal layer of skin onto the newly formed nail plate. The perionyx is the projecting edge of the eponychium covering the proximal strip of the lunula.

The nail wall (vallum unguis) is the cutaneous fold overlapping the sides and proximal end of the nail. The lateral margin (margo lateralis) lies beneath the nail wall on the sides of the nail, and the nail groove or fold (sulcus matricis unguis) are the cutaneous slits into which the lateral margins are embedded.

==== Paronychium ====
The paronychium is the soft tissue border around the nail, and paronychia is an infection in this area. The paronychium is the skin that overlaps onto the sides of the nail plate, also known as the paronychial edge. The paronychium is the site of hangnails, ingrown nails, and paronychia, a skin infection.

==== Hyponychium ====
The hyponychium is the area of epithelium, particularly the thickened portion, underlying the free edge of the nail plate. It is sometimes called the "quick", as in the phrase "cutting to the quick".

== Function ==
A healthy fingernail has the function of protecting the distal phalanx, the fingertip, and the surrounding soft tissues from injuries. It also serves to enhance precise delicate movements of the distal digits through counter-pressure exerted on the pulp of the finger. The nail then acts as a counter-force when the end of the finger touches an object, thereby enhancing the sensitivity of the fingertip, although the nail itself has no nerve endings.

Finally, the nail functions as a tool, enabling a so-called "extended precision grip" (e.g., pulling out a splinter in one's finger), and certain cutting or scraping actions.

=== Growth ===
The growing part of the nail is under the skin at the nail's proximal end under the epidermis, which is the only living part of a nail.

In mammals, the growth rate of nails is related to the length of the terminal phalanges (outermost finger bones). Thus, in humans, the nail of the index finger grows faster than that of the little finger; and fingernails grow up to four times faster than toenails.

In humans, fingernails grow at an average rate of approx. 3.5 mm (0.14 in) a month, whereas toenails grow about half as fast (approx. average 1.6 mm (0.063 in) a month). Fingernails require three to six months to regrow completely, and toenails require twelve to eighteen months. Actual growth rate is dependent upon age, sex, season, exercise level, diet, and hereditary factors. The longest female nails known ever to have existed measured a total of 8.65 m (28 ft 4.5 in). Contrary to popular belief, nails do not continue to grow after death; the skin dehydrates and tightens, making the nails (and hair) appear to grow.

=== Permeability ===
The nail is often considered an impermeable barrier, but this is not true. In fact, it is much more permeable than the skin, and the composition of the nail includes 7–12% water. This permeability has implications for penetration by harmful and medicinal substances; in particular cosmetics applied to the nails can pose a risk. Water can penetrate the nail as can many other substances including paraquat, a fast acting herbicide that is harmful to humans; urea which is often an ingredient in creams and lotions meant for use on hands and fingers; several fungicidal agents such as salicylic acid, miconazole branded Monistat, natamycin; and sodium hypochlorite which is the active ingredient in common household bleach (but usually only in 2–3% concentration).

== Clinical significance ==
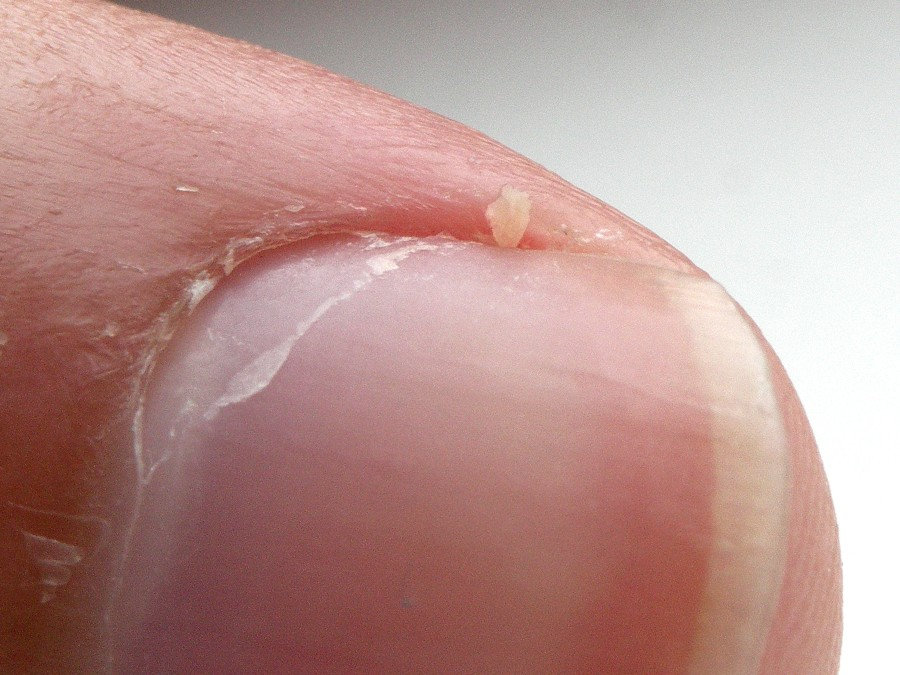
Thumbnail of the right hand with cuticle (left) and hangnail (top)

Healthcare and pre-hospital-care providers (EMTs or paramedics) often use the fingernail beds as a cursory indicator of distal tissue perfusion of individuals who may be dehydrated or in shock. However, this test is not considered reliable in adults. This is known as the CRT or blanch test. The fingernail bed is briefly depressed to turn the nail-bed white. When the pressure is released, the normal pink colour should be restored within a second or two. Delayed return to pink color can be an indicator of certain shock states such as hypovolemia.

Nail growth record can show the history of recent health and physiological imbalances, and has been used as a diagnostic tool since ancient times. Deep, horizontally transverse grooves known as "Beau's lines" may form across the nails (horizontal, not along the nail from cuticle to tip). These lines are usually a natural consequence of aging, although they may result from disease. Discoloration, thinning, thickening, brittleness, splitting, grooves, Mees' lines, small white spots, receded lunula, clubbing (convex), flatness, and spooning (concave) can indicate illness in other areas of the body, nutrient deficiencies, drug reaction, poisoning, or merely local injury.

Nails can also become thickened (onychogryphosis), loosened (onycholysis), infected with fungus (onychomycosis), or degenerate (onychodystrophy). A common nail disorder is an ingrowing toenail (onychocryptosis).

Bluish or purple fingernail beds may be a symptom of peripheral cyanosis, which indicates oxygen deprivation.

DNA profiling is a technique employed by forensic scientists on hair, fingernails, toenails, etc.

=== Health and care ===
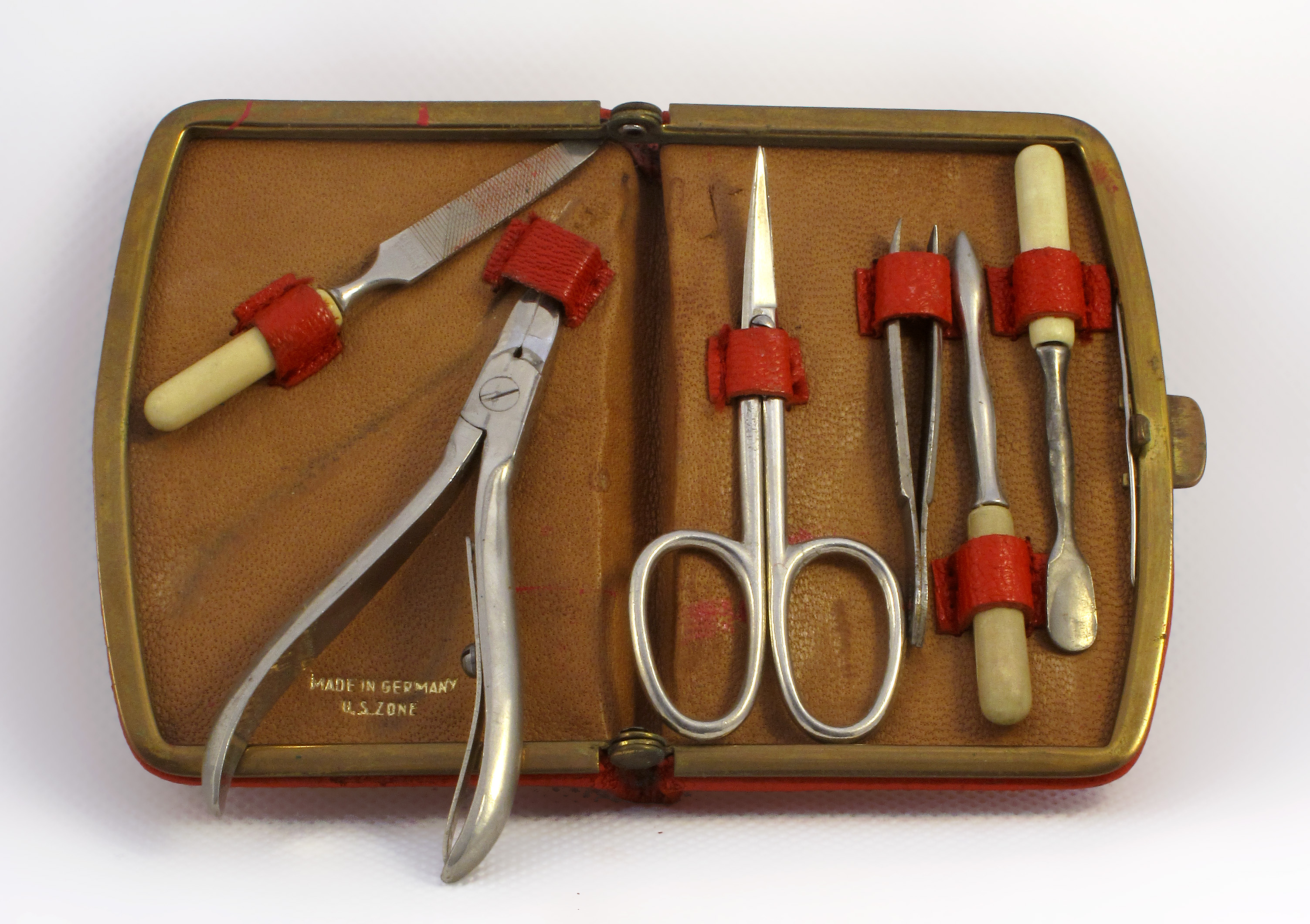
A set of professional nail care tools

The best way to care for nails is to trim them regularly. Filing is also recommended, as to keep nails from becoming too rough and to remove any small bumps or ridges that may cause the nail to get tangled up in materials such as cloth.

Nails can dry out, just like skin. They can also peel, break, and be infected. Toe infections, for instance, can be caused or exacerbated by dirty socks, specific types of aggressive exercise (long-distance running), tight footwear, and walking unprotected in an unclean environment. Common organisms causing nail infections include yeasts and molds (particularly dermatophytes).

Nail tools used by different people may transmit infections. Standard hygiene and sanitation procedures avoid transmission. In some cases, gel and cream cuticle removers can be used instead of cuticle scissors.

Nail disease can present very subtly, and should be evaluated by a dermatologist with a focus in this particular area of medicine. One's nail stylist may note such changes.

Inherited accessory nail of the fifth toe occurs where the toenail of the smallest toe is separated, forming a smaller "sixth toenail" in the outer corner of the nail. Like any other nail, it can be cut using a nail clipper.

Finger entrapment injuries are common in children and can include damage to the finger pulp and fingernail. These are usually treated by cleaning the area and applying a sterile dressing. Surgery may sometimes be required to repair the laceration or broken bones.

=== Effect of nutrition ===
Biotin-rich foods and supplements may help strengthen brittle fingernails.

Vitamin A is an essential micronutrient for vision, reproduction, cell and tissue differentiation, and immune function. Vitamin D and calcium work together in cases of maintaining homeostasis, creating muscle contraction, transmission of nerve pulses, blood clotting, and membrane structure. A lack of vitamin A, vitamin D, or calcium can cause dryness and brittleness.

Insufficient vitamin B_{12} can lead to excessive dryness, darkened nails, and rounded or curved nail ends. Insufficient intake of both vitamin A and B results in fragile nails with transverse and longitudinal ridges. Some over-the-counter vitamin supplements such as certain multivitamins and biotin may help in growth of strong nails, although this is quite subjective. Both vitamin B_{12} and folate play a role in red blood cell production and oxygen transportation to nail cells. Inadequacies can result in discoloration of the nails.

Diminished dietary intake of omega-3 fatty acids may contribute to dry and brittle nails.

Protein is a building material for new nails; therefore, low dietary protein intake may cause anemia and the resultant reduced hemoglobin in the blood filling the capillaries of the nail bed reflects varying amounts of light incident on the nail matrix resulting in lighter shades of pink ultimately resulting in white nail beds when the hemoglobin is very low. When hemoglobin is close to 15 or 16 grams, most of the spectrum of light is absorbed and only the pink color is reflected back and the nails look pink.

Essential fatty acids play a large role in healthy skin as well as nails. Splitting and flaking of nails may be due to a lack of linoleic acid.

Iron-deficiency anemia can lead to a pale color along with a thin, brittle, ridged texture. Iron deficiency in general may cause the nails to become flat or concave, rather than convex. As oxygen is needed for healthy nails, an iron deficiency or anemia can lead to longitudinal ridges or concavity in the nails. RDAs for iron vary considerably depending on age and gender. The recommendation for men is 8 mg per day, while that of women aged 19–50 is 18 mg per day. After women hit age 50 or go through menopause, their iron needs drop to 8 mg daily.

== Society and culture ==
=== Fashion ===
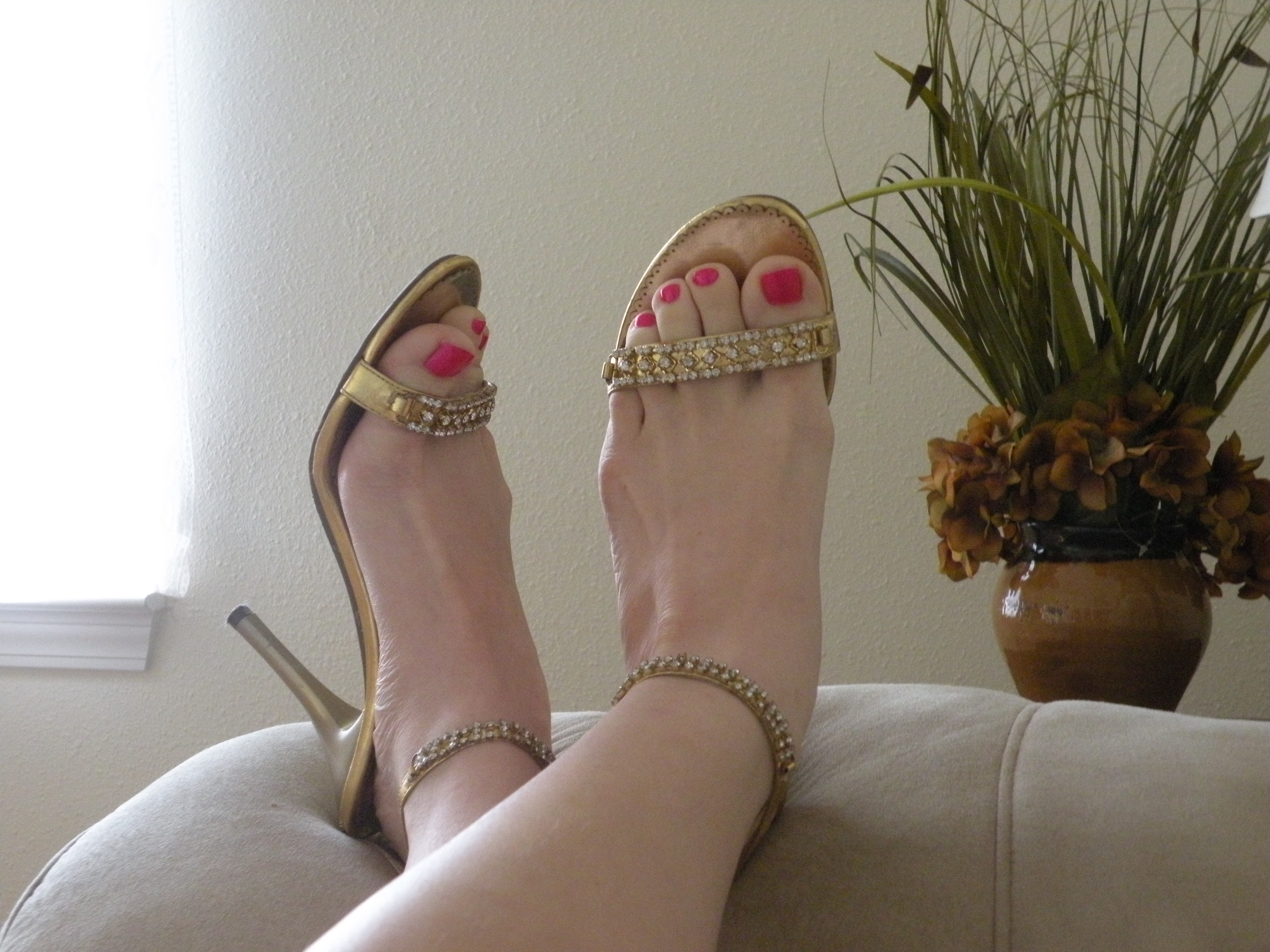
Toenails painted with magenta nail polish

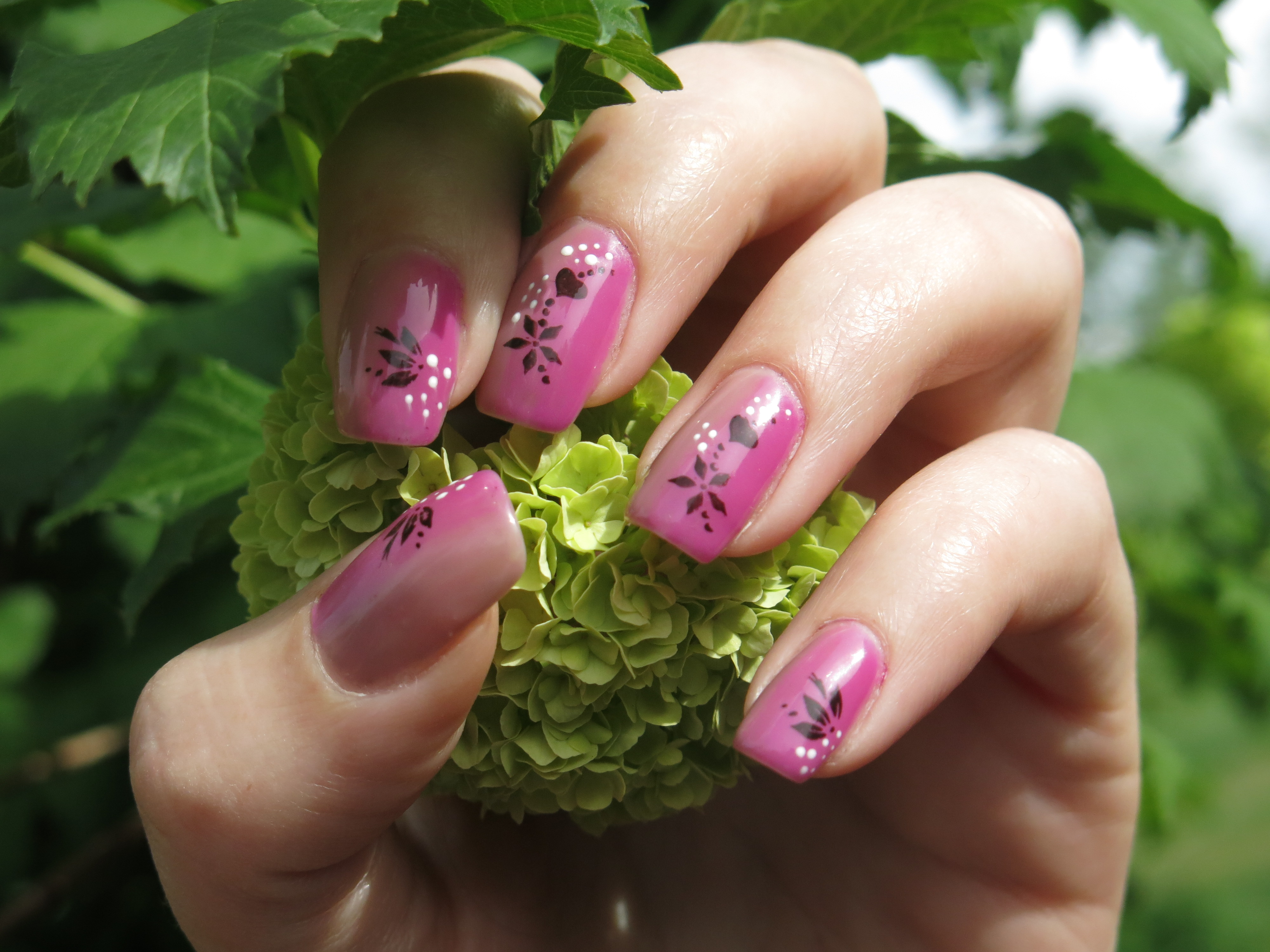
Nail art

Manicures (for the hands) and pedicures (for the feet) are health and cosmetic procedures to groom, trim, and paint the nails and manage calluses. They require various tools such as cuticle scissors, nail scissors, nail clippers, and nail files. Artificial nails can also be fixed onto real nails for cosmetic purposes.

A person whose occupation is to cut, shape and care for nails as well as to apply overlays such as acrylic and UV gel is sometimes called a nail stylist. The place where a nail stylist works may be a nail salon or nail shop or nail bar.

Painting the nails with colored nail polish (also called nail lacquer and nail varnish) to improve the appearance is a common practice dating back to at least 3000 BC.

Acrylic nails are made out of acrylic glass (PMMA). When it is mixed with a liquid monomer (usually ethyl methacrylate mixed with some inhibitor) it forms a malleable bead. This mixture begins to cure immediately, continuing until completely solid in minutes. Acrylic nails can last up to 21 days but can last longer with touch-ups. To give acrylic nails color, gel polish, nail polish, and dip powders can be applied.

Gel nails can be used in order to create artificial nail extensions, but can also be used like nail polish. They are hardened using ultraviolet light. They last longer than regular nail polish and do not chip. They have a high-gloss finish and last for two to three weeks.

Nail wraps are formed by cutting pieces of fiberglass, linen, silk fabric, or another material to fit on the surface of the nail (or a tip attached prior), to be sealed onto the nail plate with a layer of resin or glue. They do not damage the nail and also provide strength to the nail but are not used to lengthen it. It can also be used to fix broken nails. However, the treatment is more expensive.

With the dip powder method, a clear liquid is brushed onto a nail and the nail is then placed into pigmented powder. Dip nails tend to last about a month, 2–3 weeks longer than gel and acrylic nails. It can be worn on natural nails, or with tips to create an artificial nail. Dip powder nails do not require any UV/LED light to be cured, instead they are sealed using an activator. The quickest way to remove dip powder is to drill, clip off, or buff out layers of the powder so, when they are soaking in acetone, they slide right off.

=== Length records ===
Guinness World Records began tracking record fingernail lengths in 1955, when a Chinese priest was listed as having fingernails 1 foot 10.75 inches (57.79 cm) long.

The current record-holder for men, according to Guinness, is Shridhar Chillal from India who set the record in 1998 with a total of 20 feet 2.25 inches (615.32 cm) of nails on his left hand. His longest nail, on his thumb, was 4 feet 9.6 inches (146.3 cm) long.

The former record-holder for women was Lee Redmond of the U.S., who set the record in 2001 and as of 2008 had nails with a total length on both hands of 28 feet (850 cm), with the longest nail on her right thumb at 2 feet 11 inches (89 cm). However, as of 2022, the record for women is held by Diana Armstrong from Minneapolis. Her nails were 42 feet 10.4 inches long (1,306.58 cm).

== Evolution in primates ==
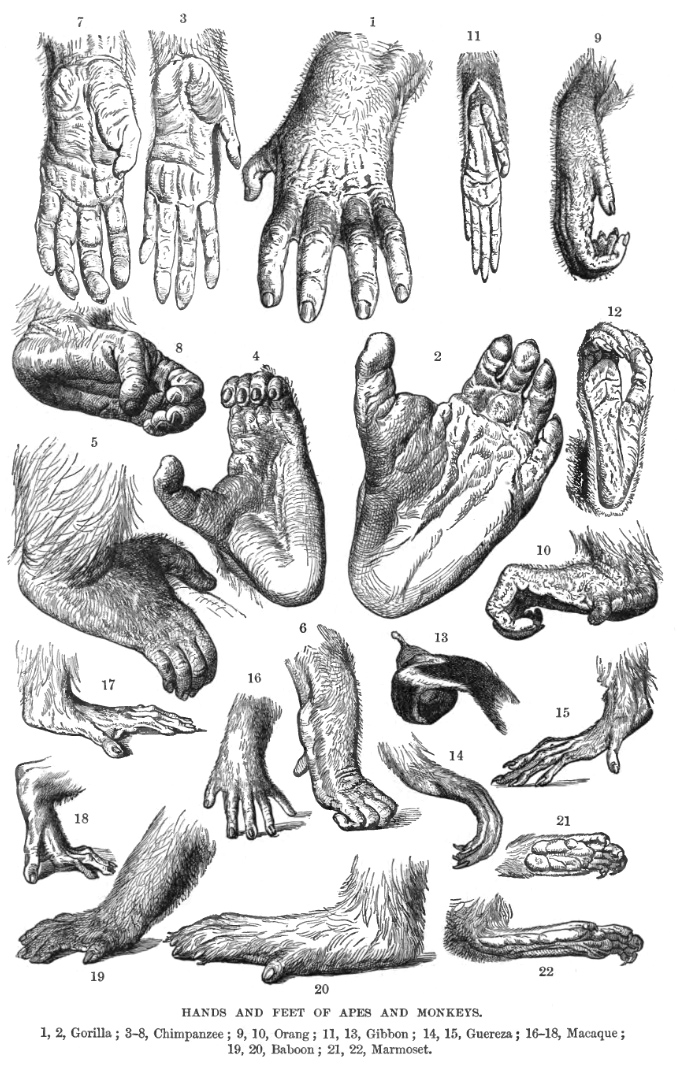
Nails are a distinguishing feature of the primate order.

The nail is an unguis, meaning a keratin structure at the end of a digit. Other examples of ungues include the claw, hoof, and talon. The nails of primates and the hooves of running mammals evolved from the claws of earlier animals.

In contrast to nails, claws are typically curved ventrally (downwards in animals) and compressed sideways. They serve a multitude of functions—including climbing, digging, and fighting—and have undergone numerous adaptive changes in different animal taxa. Claws are pointed at their ends and are composed of two layers: a thick, deep layer and a superficial, hardened layer which serves a protective function. The underlying bone is a virtual mold of the overlying horny structure and therefore has the same shape as the claw or nail. Compared to claws, nails are flat, less curved, and do not extend far beyond the tip of the digits. The ends of the nails usually consist only of the "superficial", hardened layer and are not pointed like claws.

With only a few exceptions, primates retain plesiomorphic (original, "primitive") hands with five digits, each equipped with either a nail or a claw. For example, nearly all living strepsirrhine primates have nails on all digits except the second toe which is equipped with a grooming claw. Tarsiers have a grooming claw on second and third toes. Less commonly known, a grooming claw is also found on the second pedal digit of owl monkeys (Aotus), titis (Callicebus), and possibly other New World monkeys. The needle-clawed bushbaby (Euoticus) has keeled nails (the thumb and the first and the second toes have claws) featuring a central ridge that ends in a needle-like tip.

A study of the fingertip morphology of four small-bodied New World monkey species indicated a correlation between increasing small-branch foraging and:

1. expanded apical pads (fingertips),
2. developed epidermal ridges (fingerprints),
3. broadened distal parts of distal phalanges (fingertip bones), and
4. reduced flexor and extensor tubercles (attachment areas for finger muscles on bones).

This suggests that whereas claws are useful on large-diameter branches, wide fingertips with nails and epidermal ridges were required for habitual locomotion on small-diameter branches. It also indicates keel-shaped nails of Callitrichines (a family of New World monkeys) is a derived postural adaptation rather than retained ancestral condition.

An alternative theory is that the nails of primates evolved to enable silent movement through trees while stalking prey, replacing noisier claws to make ambush hunting more effective.

== Nails in nonprimates ==
Carpolestes simpsoni, an extinct species of Plesiadapiforms, an early late Paleocene primate-like mammal had a nail on its opposable hallux. Rodentia, have nails on their first digit used in manual food handling. Such a nail combined with dexterous feeding movement with incisors allow rodents to exploit hard seeds and nuts, a niche that they dominate. This thumbnail is argued to be ancestrial with exceptions being linked to its replacement by claws in subterranean habits and for oral-only feeding.

== See also ==
- List of cutaneous conditions
- Nail disease
- Foot fetishism
- Hand fetishism
- Onychogryphosis, overgrown, claw-like nails
