= Largest body parts =

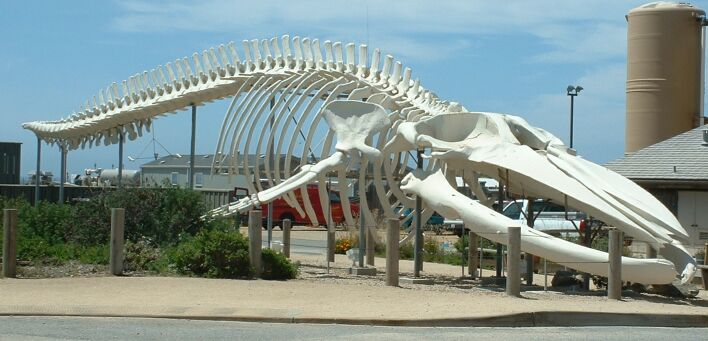
A model of the skeleton of a blue whale, the largest animal on earth

The largest body part is either the largest given body part across all living and extinct organisms or the largest example of a body part within an existing species. The largest animals on the planet are not the only ones to have large body parts, with some smaller animals actually having one particularly enlarged area of the body.

Furthermore, there are two kinds of body parts described in this article. Absolute largest, and largest in relation to its body size. This distinction is critical in evolutionary biology, as traits like the extremely long tail feathers of the ribbon-tailed astrapia (Astrapia mayeri), which are the longest in relation to body size of any bird, are often the result of intense sexual selection.

== Absolute largest ==
=== Blue whale ===
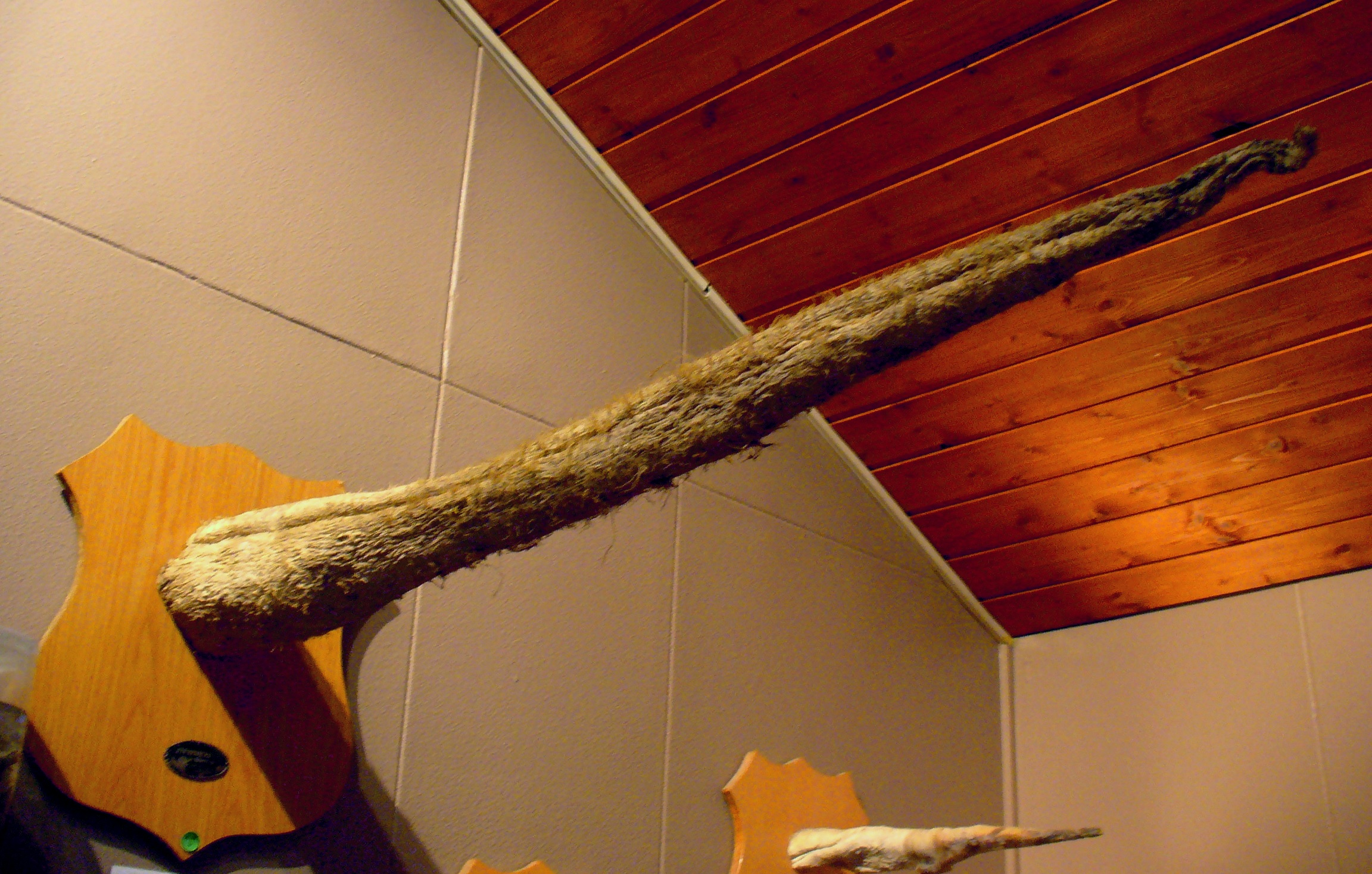
Blue whale penis

The blue whale is the largest animal that is known to have ever existed and has the largest instance of several body parts. Its tongue weighs around 2.7 tonnes (3.0 short tons; 2,700 kg), and its mouth is large enough to hold up to 90 tonnes (99 short tons; 90,000 kg) of food and water. The blue whale makes use of these parts to capture its exclusive diet of krill by lunge feeding, a process where huge gulps of water are forced through the baleen by the tongue and throat pouch.

To supply its body with blood, the blue whale has the largest heart, typically weighing 600 kg (1,300 lb; 0.66 short tons) or up to 900 kg (2,000 lb; 0.99 short tons) in exceptional cases. It possesses a correspondingly large aorta, about 23 centimetres (9.1 in) in diameter. The weight of the heart of a stranded North Atlantic blue whale was 180 kg (400 lb), the largest known in any animal.

The blue whale's penis typically measures about 3 m (9.8 ft) long with a diameter of 20 to 30 centimetres (7.9 to 11.8 in).

=== Other animals ===
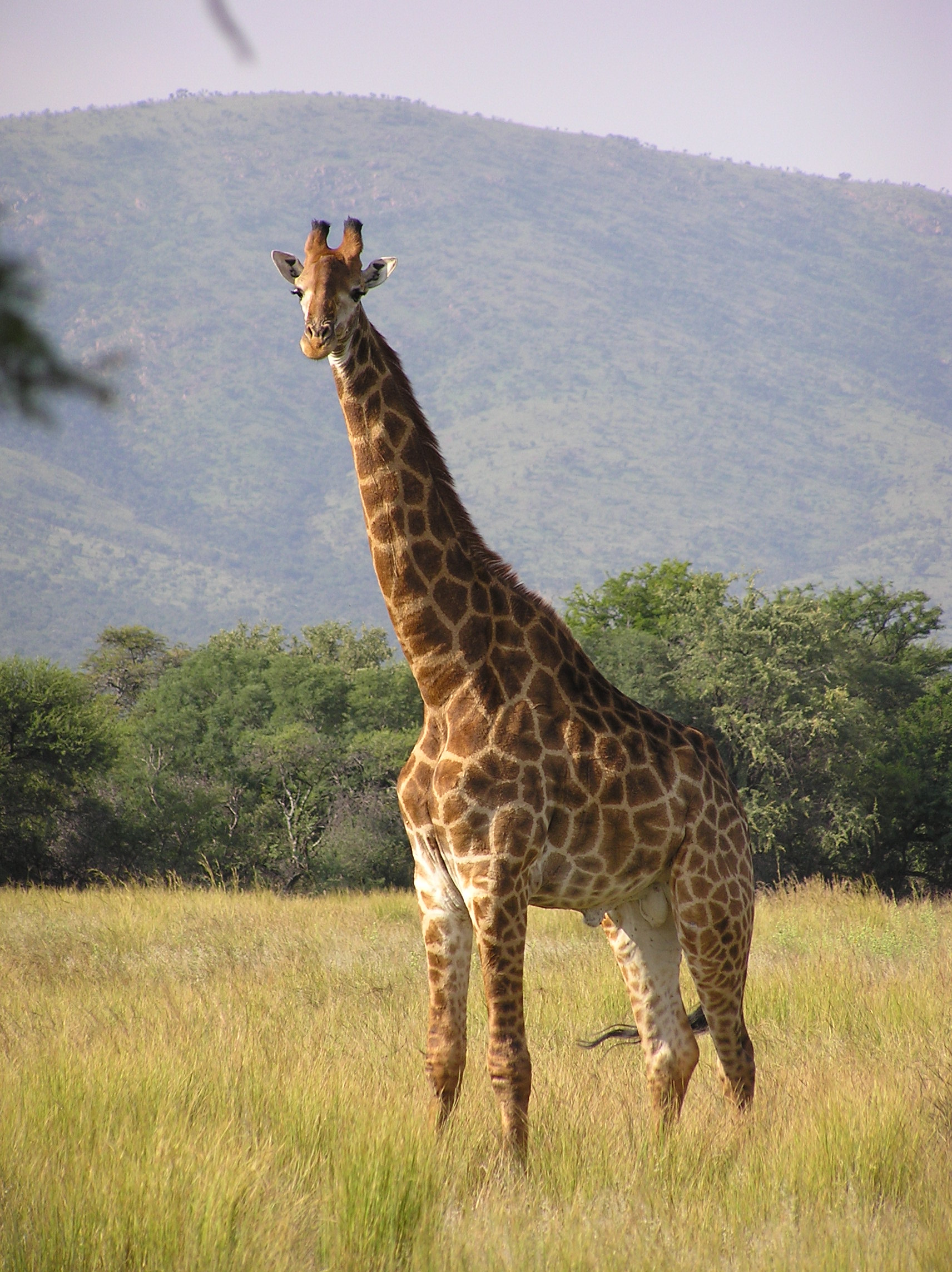
Giraffes are instantly recognisable for their long necks.

The tallest land animal, measuring up to 5.8 m (19 ft) tall, is the giraffe, which possesses the longest neck (up to 2.4 m or 7.9 ft long) and legs (1.8m or 6ft long) of any land mammal.

The longest tentacles belong to the lion's mane jellyfish, with one specimen's tentacles having reached 36.6 m (120 ft). It was found washed up on the shore of Massachusetts Bay in 1870. For comparison, the giant squid's tentacles only reach 10 m (32.8 ft) long.

The giant and colossal squids have the largest recorded eyes of any living animal, with a maximum diameter of at least 27 cm (11 in). Only the extinct ichthyosaurs are known to have had larger eyes.

The north Pacific right whale has the largest testes of any mammal. The walrus has the largest baculum of any mammal. The wandering albatross has the largest wingspan at 3.63 metres (11 feet 11 inches). The longest horns ever recorded belonged to a wild water buffalo and measured 4.24 metres (13 feet 11 inches) from tip to tip. The largest and heaviest brain belongs to the sperm whale, weighing around 9 kilograms.

Bootlace worms can reach great lengths. A specimen was measured at 55 m (180 ft) but this may be unreliable as the body is somewhat elastic, and the specimen may have been stretched beyond its resting length in life.

== In proportion to body size ==
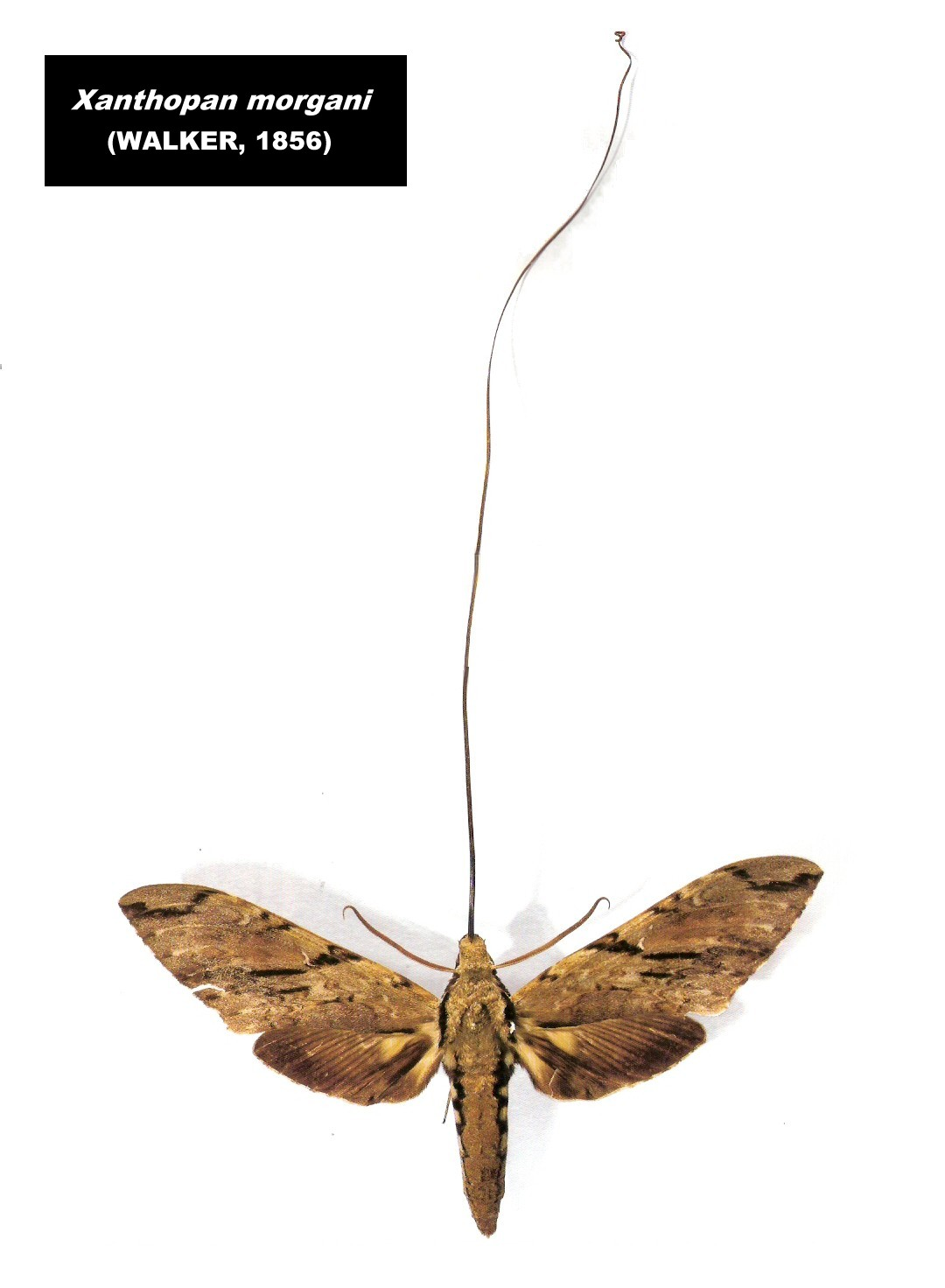
A Morgan's sphinx hawk moth with its proboscis unfurled to show its length

- The Morgan's sphinx hawk moth has the longest proboscis in relation to its body size. Its 25–30 cm proboscis is over 3 times longer than its body. It is also known as Darwin's moth because Charles Darwin predicted its existence some 40 years before it was discovered from experiments he did on an orchid with a "foot long" nectary.
- The tube-lipped nectar bat has the longest tongue of any mammal in relation to its body size. Its 85 mm (3.3 in) tongue is 1.5 times longer than its body, and must be kept inside its rib cage.
- The barnacle is the creature with the largest penis as a proportion of its body size.
- Among vertebrates, the Argentine blue-bill duck has the longest penis in relation to its body size.
- The vampire squid has the largest eyes of any animal relative to its size.
- The kiwi lays the largest egg of any bird relative to its size – up to a quarter of the mass of the female.
- Viperfish have the largest teeth of any fish relative to its size.
- Shrews have the largest brain-to-body mass ratio of any animal, with brains that are 10% of body weight. Humans however have the largest encephalization quotient of any animal.
- Dogs have the largest heart-to-body mass ratio.
- The jerboa has the largest ear as a proportion of its body size.

== Humans ==
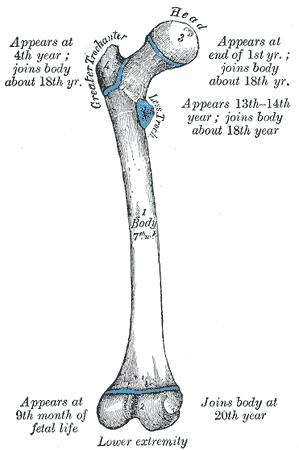
The femur is the longest bone in humans

- The longest bone in the human body is the femur.
- The largest artery is the aorta and the largest vein is the inferior vena cava.
- The largest internal organ (by mass) is the liver, with an average of 1.6 kilograms (3.5 pounds).
- The largest external organ, which is also the largest organ in general, is the skin.
- The longest muscle is the sartorius muscle in the thigh.
- The longest single nerve is the sciatic nerve in the thigh, counting its branches and axons.

=== Individual human records ===
- The person with the longest tongue is Nick Stoeberl of Salinas, California, United States, whose tongue measures 10.1 centimetres (3.98 in).
- The woman with the longest legs is Maci Currin. At a height of 208.28 cm (6.83 ft), her legs measure 134.78 centimetres (53 in).
- The woman with the longest fingernails is Lee Redmond. The total length of her fingernails is 7.513 meters. The person with the longest fingernails on one hand is Shridhar Chillal, the woman with the longest fingernails on one hand is Ayanna Williams.
- The longest head of hair belonged to Xie Qiuping of China and measured 5.627 metres (18 feet 5.5 inches) on 8 May 2004.
- The longest beard ever measured belonged to Hans Langseth of Norway; at his death in 1927 it was 5.33 metres (17.5 ft) long.
- The longest ear hair belongs to Victor Anthony of India, measuring 18.1 centimetres (7.12 inches).
- The largest feet belonged to Matthew McGrory. His left foot measured 17 inches (43 cm) and he wore size 29 1/2 shoes.

== Extinct animals ==
- The animals with the longest necks, up to 15 metres (49 ft) in some cases, were plesiosaurs (such as Elasmosaurus and Mauisaurus) and sauropod dinosaurs (such as Mamenchisaurus, Sauroposeidon, and Supersaurus).
- Maraapunisaurus fragillimus had a tail of 30.3-32 meters (99-105 ft) in the time that we had the fossil.
- Another notable example is Tanystropheus, a genus of Archosauromorpha reptiles from the Middle Triassic period. The species Tanystropheus hydroides could reach lengths of approximately 6 meters (20 ft), with its neck comprising about half of its total body length. This neck was composed of just 13 elongated vertebrae, making it three times longer than the torso.
- The largest body part on an extinct aquatic animal was the neck of the Elasmosaurus which was up to 7.1 meters (23 ft). The Elasmosaurus and its cousin the Albertonects were some of the longest necked animals ever to have lived.

== See also ==
- Largest and heaviest animals
- Largest organisms
- Largest prehistoric organisms
- Giant animal (disambiguation)
