= Ayanna Williams =

Nail artist

- Born: Houston, Texas
- Occupation: Nail artist
- Known for: Guinness World Record for longest finger nails by a woman

Ayanna Williams is an American who previously held the world record (among currently living people) for the longest fingernails on a pair of female hands, with a combined length of 733.55 centimeters (288.79 inches). Ayanna was awarded the Guinness World Record in 2018 for being the woman with the longest fingernails in the world. Her record only included living people (Lee Redmond still held the all-time record until Diana Armstrong broke it in 2022).

== Biography ==
Ayanna pursued her interest in growing nails and engaged in nail art during her young age as a kid. She spent over 30 years growing her nails without cutting them. Although proud of her record-breaking nails, Ayanna has faced increasing difficulties due to the weight of her finger nails. She found difficulties when engaging in day-to-day activities such as washing plates, dishes and putting sheets on a bed.

In 2021, she decided to cut her nails. On 9 April 2021, she had her fingernails cut by Allison Readinger of Trinity Vista Dermatology using an electronic rotary power tool at the Ripley's Believe It or Not! museum in New York City, where the nails were put on display for the public.

The nails were measured for one last time in 2021 and the reading marked as 733.55 centimeters (240.7 inches) before cutting them down.

== See also ==
- Shridhar Chillal, who holds the world record for longest fingernails on a single hand.
