= Icelandic Phallological Museum =

Museum of penises and penis parts in Reykjavik, Iceland

- Established: 1997
- Location: Hafnartorg, Reykjavík, Iceland
- Coordinates: 64.14862°N 21.93583°W
- Collection size: Over 300 penises 170 cm (67 in)–2 mm (0.08 in)
- Visitors: 70,000 annually
- Founder: Sigurður Hjartarson
- Website: www.phallus.is

The Icelandic Phallological Museum (Icelandic: Hið íslenzka reðasafn [ˈhɪːð ˈistlɛnska ˈrɛːðaˌsapn̥]), located in Reykjavík, Iceland, houses the world's largest display of penises and penile parts. It holds over 300 penises from more than 100 species of mammals. The museum also holds 22 imagined penises of creatures from Icelandic folklore.

In July 2011, the museum obtained its first human penis, one of many promised by would-be donors. Its detachment from the donor's body did not go according to plan and it was reduced to a greyish-brown shriveled mass that was pickled in a jar of formalin. The museum continues to search for "a younger and a bigger and better one." In the meantime, they have begun exhibiting a cast Matt Barr sent them of his claimed macrophallic anatomy, a man of Great Britain who they say according to the pictures he sent them "has the longest urinary measurement ever recorded and...the longest and girthiest phallus, of any man alive today."

Founded in 1997 by since-then retired teacher Sigurður Hjartarson and now run by his son Hjörtur Gísli Sigurðsson, the museum grew out of an interest in penises that began during Sigurður's childhood when he was given a cattle whip made from a bull's penis. He obtained the organs of Icelandic animals from sources around the country, with acquisitions ranging from the 170 cm (5 ft 7 in) front tip of a sperm whale penis to the blue whale penis, which is 3 feet (91 cm) long, 2 mm (0.08 in) baculum of a hamster, which can only be seen with a magnifying glass. The museum claims that its collection includes the penises of elves and trolls, though, as Icelandic folklore portrays such creatures as being invisible, they cannot be seen. The collection also features phallic art and crafts such as lampshades made from the scrotums of bulls.

The museum has become a popular tourist attraction, with over 70,000 visitors yearly and receiving international media attention, including a Canadian documentary film called The Final Member, which covers the museum's quest to obtain a human penis. According to its mission statement, the museum aims to enable "individuals to undertake serious study into the field of phallology in an organized, scientific fashion."

== History ==
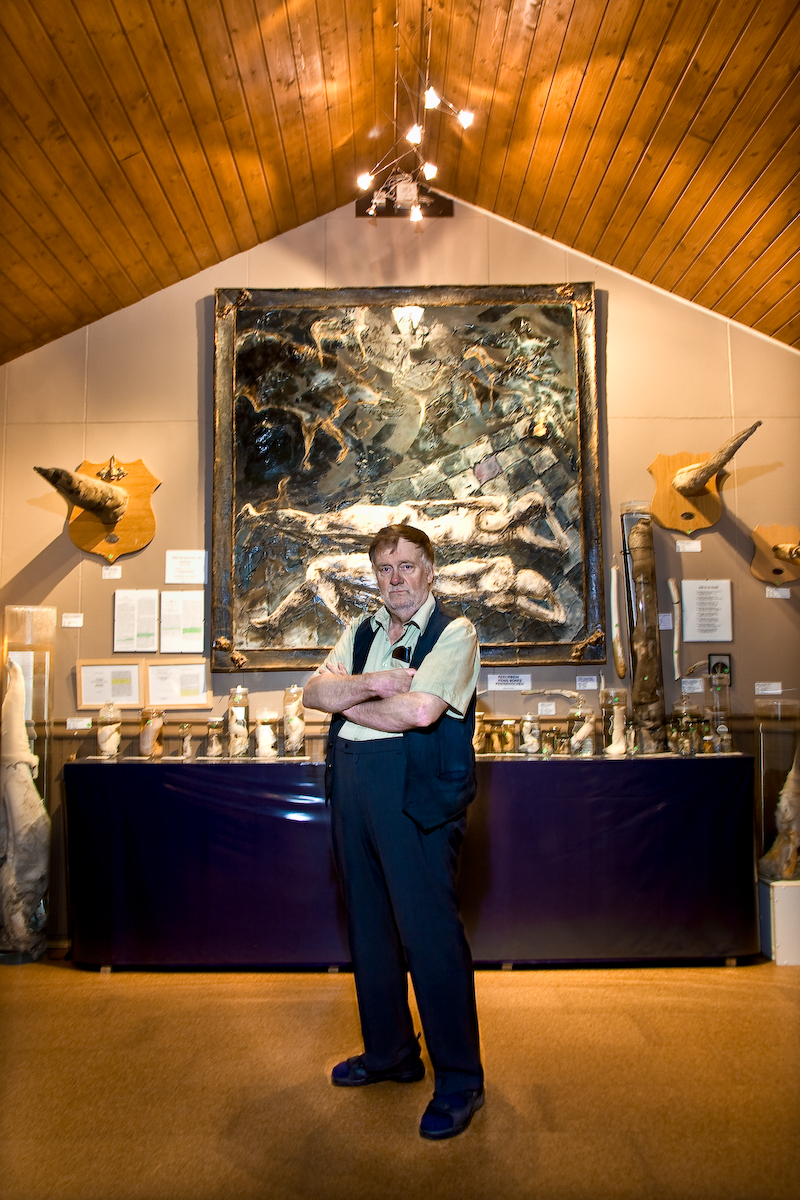
Sigurður Hjartarson, founder of the Icelandic Phallological Museum (2009)

The museum's founder Sigurður Hjartarson worked as a teacher and principal for 37 years, teaching history and Spanish at Reykjavík's Hamrahlid College for the last 26 years before his retirement. As a child, he owned a bull's pizzle, which was given to him to use as a cattle whip. He began collecting penises after a friend heard the story of the bull's penis in 1974 and gave him four new ones, three of which Sigurður gave to friends. Acquaintances at whaling stations began bringing him whale penises as well, and the collection grew from there, expanding through donations and acquisitions from various sources around Iceland.

The organs of farm animals came from slaughterhouses, while fishermen supplied those of pinnipeds and the smaller whales. The penises of larger whales came from commercial whaling stations, although this source dried up after the International Whaling Commission implemented a global ban on commercial whaling in 1986. Sigurður was able to continue to collect whale penises by harvesting them from the 12–16 whales that fall victim to stranding on the Icelandic coast each year. He also obtained the penis of a polar bear shot by fishermen who found the animal drifting on drift ice off the Westfjords.

Sigurður was assisted by his family, though not without some occasional embarrassment. His daughter Þorgerður recalls that she was once sent to a slaughterhouse to collect a specimen but arrived just as the workers were taking a lunch break: "Someone asked, 'What's in the basket?' I had to say, 'I'm collecting a frozen goat penis.' After that I said, 'I will never collect for you again.'" According to Sigurður, "Collecting penises is like collecting anything. You can never stop, you can never catch up, you can always get a new one, a better one."

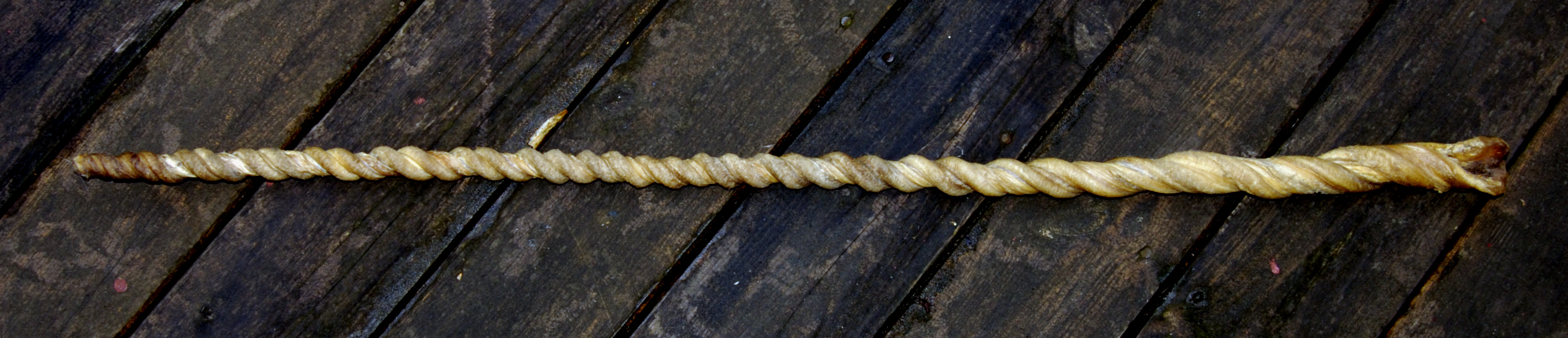
A bull's penis similar to this one, intended for use as a bullwhip, was given to the museum's founder when he was a boy and sparked a lasting interest in penises.

The collection was at first housed in Sigurður's office at the college until he retired from his teaching job. He decided, more as a hobby than a job, to put it on public display in Reykjavík and was awarded a grant from the city council of ISK 200,000 to support the opening of a museum in August 1997. By 2003, it was attracting 5,200 visitors a year, of which 4,200 were from abroad. He put the museum up for sale in 2003, but also offered it to the city of Reykjavík as a gift. However, he was unsuccessful in obtaining financial support from the state or city. When he retired in 2004, he could no longer afford the rent on the museum's premises.

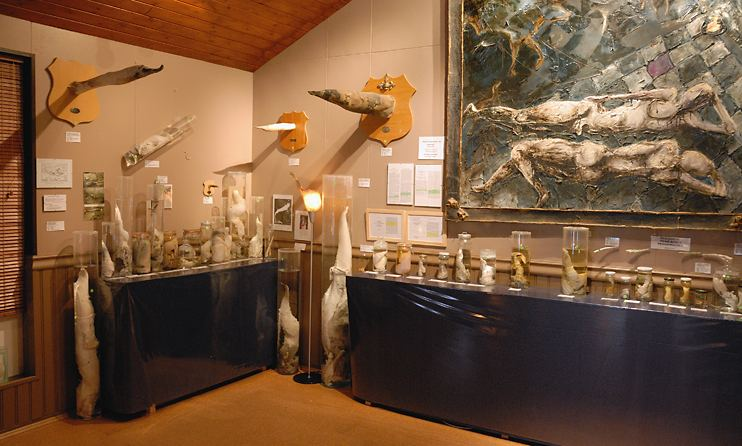
The former exhibition room in Húsavík, 2008

After his retirement, he moved along with his collection to Húsavík, a fishing village with a population of about 2,200 people located 298 miles (480 km) northeast of the capital. The museum was housed in a small building, formerly a restaurant, that was marked with a giant wooden penis and a stone phallus standing outside on the street. The village's inhabitants were at first skeptical of the new arrival, but came to accept it when they were persuaded that there was nothing pornographic about the museum.

In 2012 he handed over the collection to his son, Hjörtur Gísli Sigurðsson (described by Slate as "the world's only hereditary penis-museum operator"). It was relocated from Húsavík to Reykjavík's main shopping street at Laugavegur 116. Its former location in Húsavík is now home to The Exploration Museum. An offer from a wealthy German to buy the museum for ISK 30 million (US $232,000 / €186,000) and a proposal to move it to the United Kingdom were both turned down, as Hjörtur insists that "the museum has to be in Iceland." He intends to continue acquiring new penises because you can "always get a better, newer one ... a bigger size or better shape, you know?"

According to University of Iceland anthropologist Sigurjón Baldur Hafsteinsson, Icelanders' tolerance of the museum is an indicator of how Icelandic society has changed since the 1990s, when a newly elected neoliberal government fostered a more open outlook on entertainment, creativity and tourism that has "enabled new ideas to emerge publicly". He has documented the significance of the museum's role in Icelandic culture in a book, Phallological museum.

== Collection ==
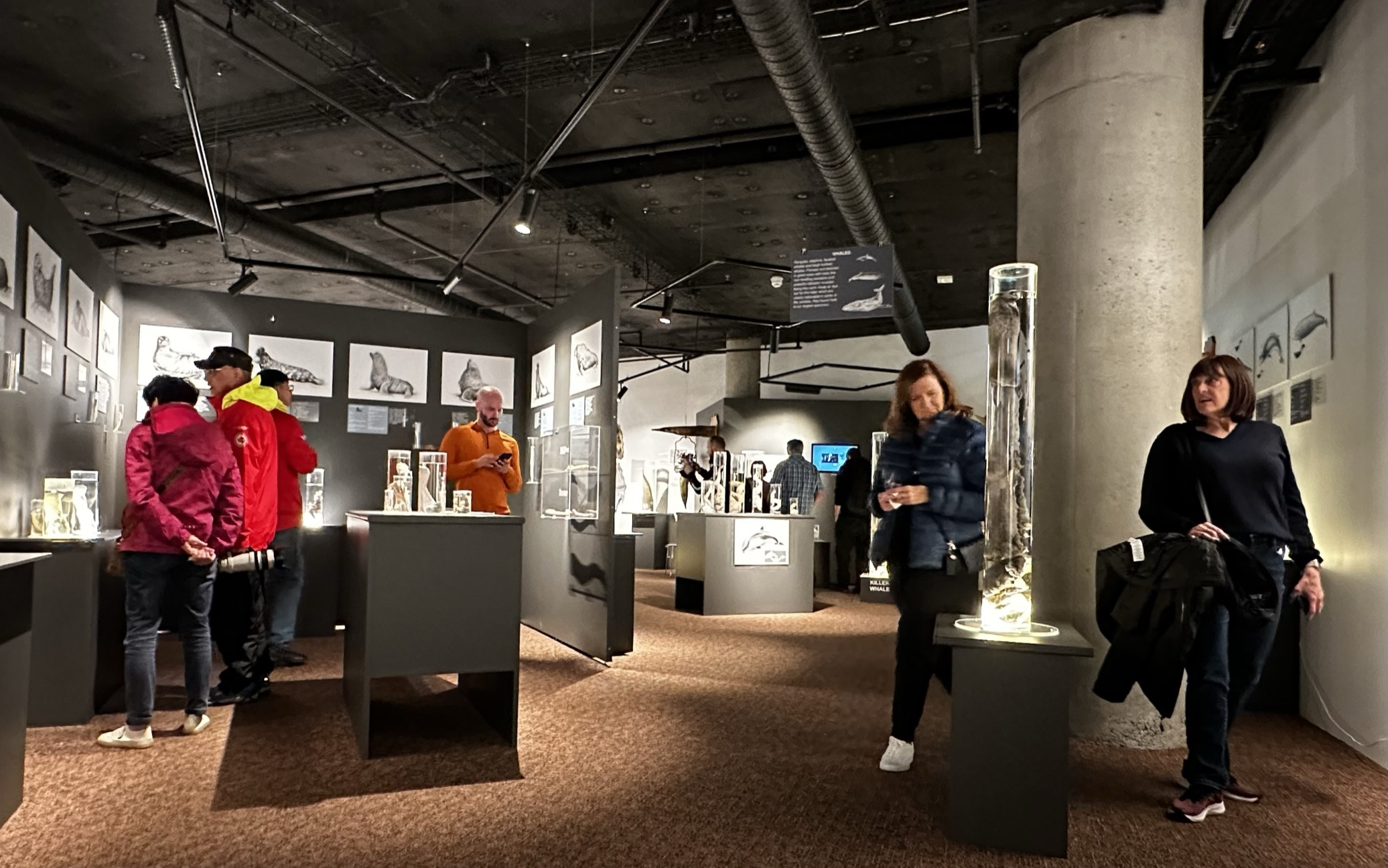
The new exhibition space at the Icelandic Phallological Museum

According to the museum's website, the collection comprises 280 specimens from 93 species of animals. They range from some of the largest to some of the smallest penises in the animal world. Its largest exhibit is a portion of a sperm whale's penis measuring 170 cm (5 ft 7 in) long and weighing 70 kilograms (154 lb), which Iceland Review has dubbed "a real Moby Dick". The specimen is just the tip, as the entire organ, when intact, would have been about 5 m (16 ft) long and weighed about 400 kilograms (880 lb). The baculum of a hamster, only 2 mm (0.08 in) long, is the smallest item in the collection and needs a magnifying glass to be viewed. Sigurður has described the collection as the product of "37 years of collecting penises. Somebody had to do it."

The museum also has a "folklore section" exhibiting mythological penises; its online catalogue lists specimens reportedly taken from elves, trolls, kelpies, and "The Nasty Ghost of Snæfell". Sigurður says that the elf's penis, which the museum's catalogue describes as "unusually big and old", is among his favourites. It cannot be seen, as Icelandic folklore holds that elves and trolls are invisible. The folkloric penises also include those of a merman, a one-legged, one-armed and one-eyed monster called a Beach-Murmurer, an Enriching Beach Mouse (said to draw "money from the sea to enrich her owner"), and an Icelandic Christmas Lad reportedly found dead at the foot of a mountain in 1985 and whose penis was presented to the museum by a former mayor of Reykjavík.

The museum's website states that it enables "individuals to undertake serious study into the field of phallology in an organized, scientific fashion", giving due prominence to a field that until now has only been "a borderline field of study in other academic disciplines such as history, art, psychology, literature and other artistic fields like music and ballet." The museum aims to collect penis specimens from every mammal in Iceland. It also exhibits phallic artwork and penis-related objects or "phallobilia" such as lampshades made from the scrotums of bulls. Other exhibits range "from an 18th-century engraving depicting the circumcision of Christ to a 20th-century plastic penis pacifier." Most of the collection has been donated, and the only purchase to date has been an elephant's penis measuring nearly 1 m (3.3 ft) long. The penises are either preserved in formaldehyde and displayed in jars or are dried and hung or mounted on the walls of the museum.

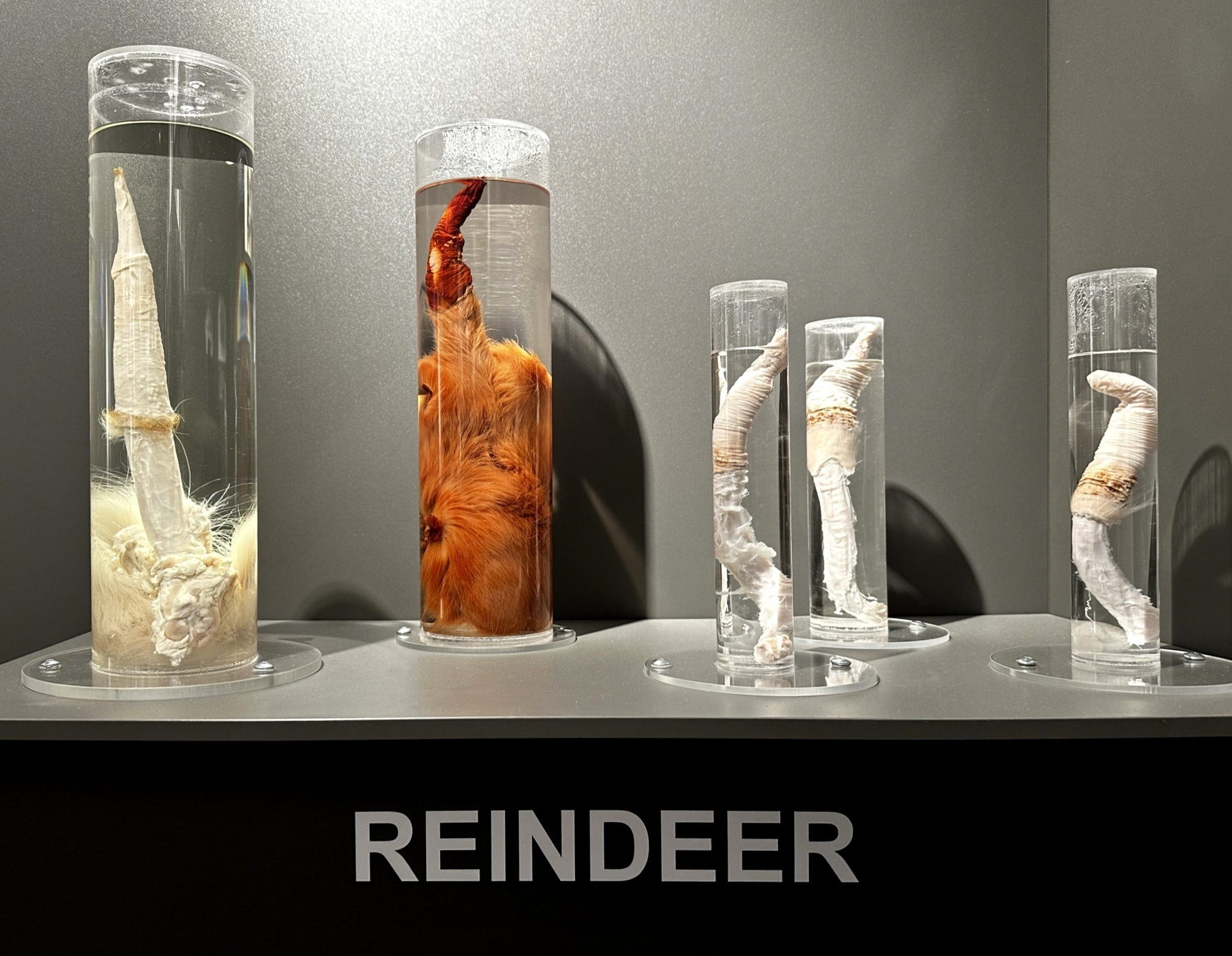
Reindeer penises on display at the museum

Sigurður has used a variety of techniques to preserve the penises, including preservation in formaldehyde, pickling, drying, stuffing and salting. One particularly large penis taken from a bull has been converted into a walking stick. Many of the museum's exhibits are illuminated by lamps made by Sigurður from rams' testicles. Sigurður has also carved wooden phalluses, which can be found adorning various objects around the museum, and has a bow tie decorated with images of phalluses that he wears on special occasions.

Josh Schonwald of Salon described his impressions of the museum when he visited in 1998:

They were hanging on the walls, stuffed in jars, displayed with curatorial love – dried penises, penises embalmed in formaldehyde, massive penises displayed like hunting trophies. A tanned bull's penis, a smoked horse's penis. There were runty, shriveled penises of reindeer, foxes, minks and rats. There were seal and walrus penises with stiff penis bones – ensuring a perpetually erect state. There was the Big Penis – a 3 ft (91 cm)-long blue whale penis (which could have been an oar for a canoe).

The museum is open every day and by July 2011 was attracting up to 11,000 visitors annually. Sixty percent of the museum's visitors are reported to be women, though according to the authors of the Rough Guide to Iceland, mentioning the museum "causes the staff at the tourist office to blush with embarrassment." The museum's guest book includes comments such as, "I've never seen so many penises–and I went to boarding school!" (from a New Zealand visitor), "They're bigger in the USA," (from someone from Wisconsin) and "Is there a vagina museum?" On this point, Sigurður has said, "I'm only collecting the male organ. Somebody else has to do the other job. I'd be interested in how they would preserve it. I think vaginas are better alive." (There used to be a pop-up museum called "Museum of Vaginal Imagination" in Rotterdam in the Netherlands and a Vagina Museum opened in London in 2017.)

=== Human penis ===
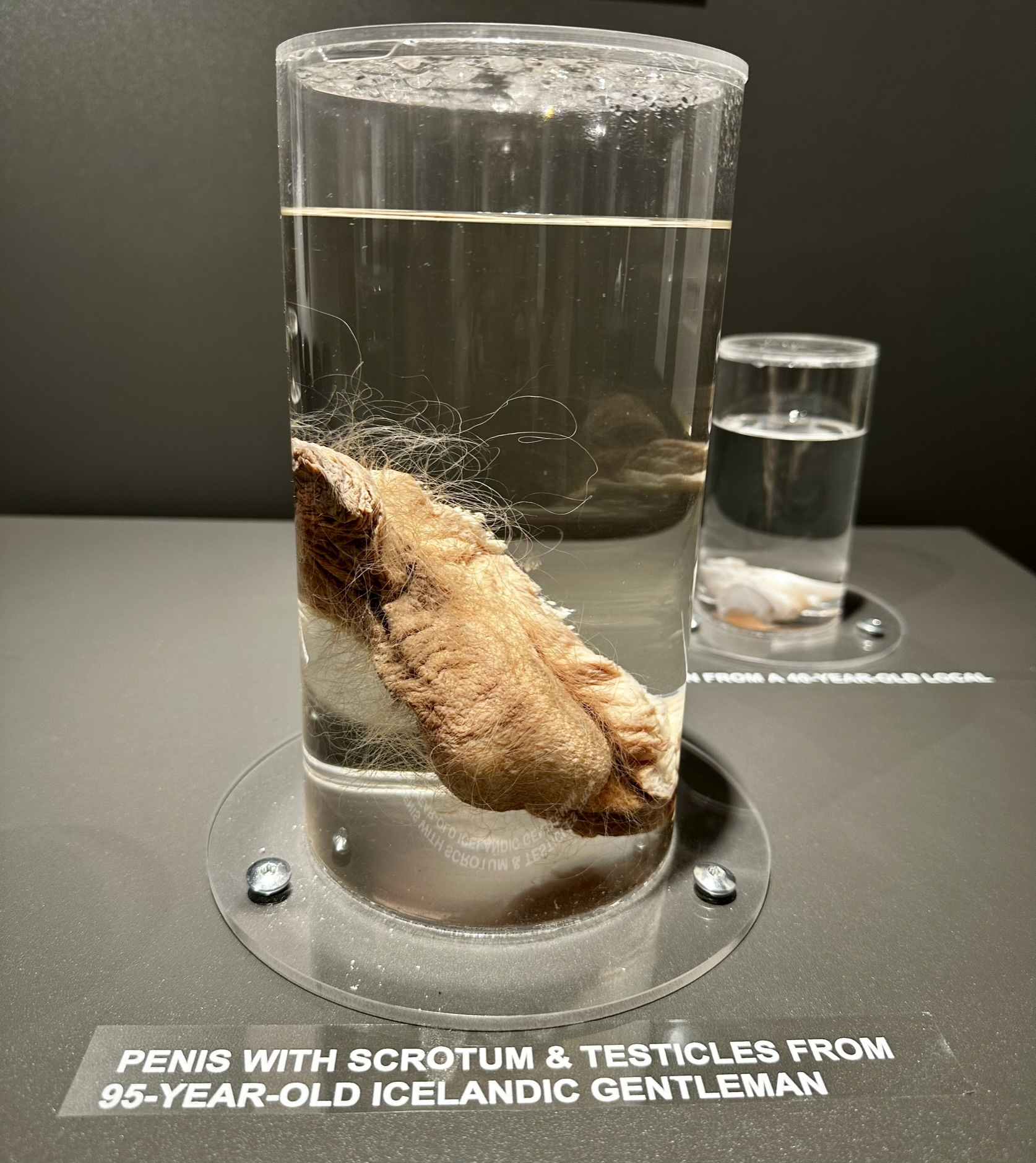
Penis and scrotum of a 95-year old Icelandic man

For many years, the museum sought to obtain a human penis. Sigurður was able to obtain human testicles and a foreskin from two separate donors; the foreskin was donated by Iceland's National Hospital after an emergency circumcision operation. The museum also contains sculptures of 15 penises based on the Iceland men's national handball team. As the team had won the silver medal at the 2008 Beijing Olympic Games, the penises were made from a silvered material. According to Sigurður, they are not displayed in the same order as the individuals shown in the photograph that accompanies them. In an interview Hjartason suggested that "their wives would recognise them." According to Slate, these sculptures were created by Sigurður's daughter, Þorgerður Sigurðardóttir, and were based on her own experience rather than any knowledge of the team. The team's goalkeeper denies that the sculptures are casts.

The museum has so far received pledges from four men—an Icelander, a German, an American and a Briton—to donate their penises. Canadian film-maker Zach Math comments that the American, Tom Mitchell, "is an ordinary guy but he has this quirk where he thinks of his penis as a separate entity from his body—Elmo. He has this dream that he wants it to be the most famous penis in the world." According to Sigurður, Mitchell "wanted to have his penis cut off even during his lifetime and then visit the museum." Mitchell sent a cast of his penis to serve as a substitute in the meantime, along with photographs of it dressed up as Santa Claus and Abraham Lincoln. The donor also tattooed his penis with the Stars and Stripes to make it look more appealing. He says that "I've always thought it'd be really cool for my penis to be the first true penis celebrity" and has made it the star of its own comic book, Elmo: Adventures of a Superhero Penis.

The Icelandic donor was a 95-year-old man from nearby Akureyri who was said to have been a womaniser in his youth and wanted to donate his penis to the museum to ensure his "eternal fame". Sigurður said that, even at the age of 95, the donor remained active, "both vertically and horizontally". However, the donor was said to be concerned that "his penis is shrinking as he gets older and he is worried it might not make a proper exhibit."

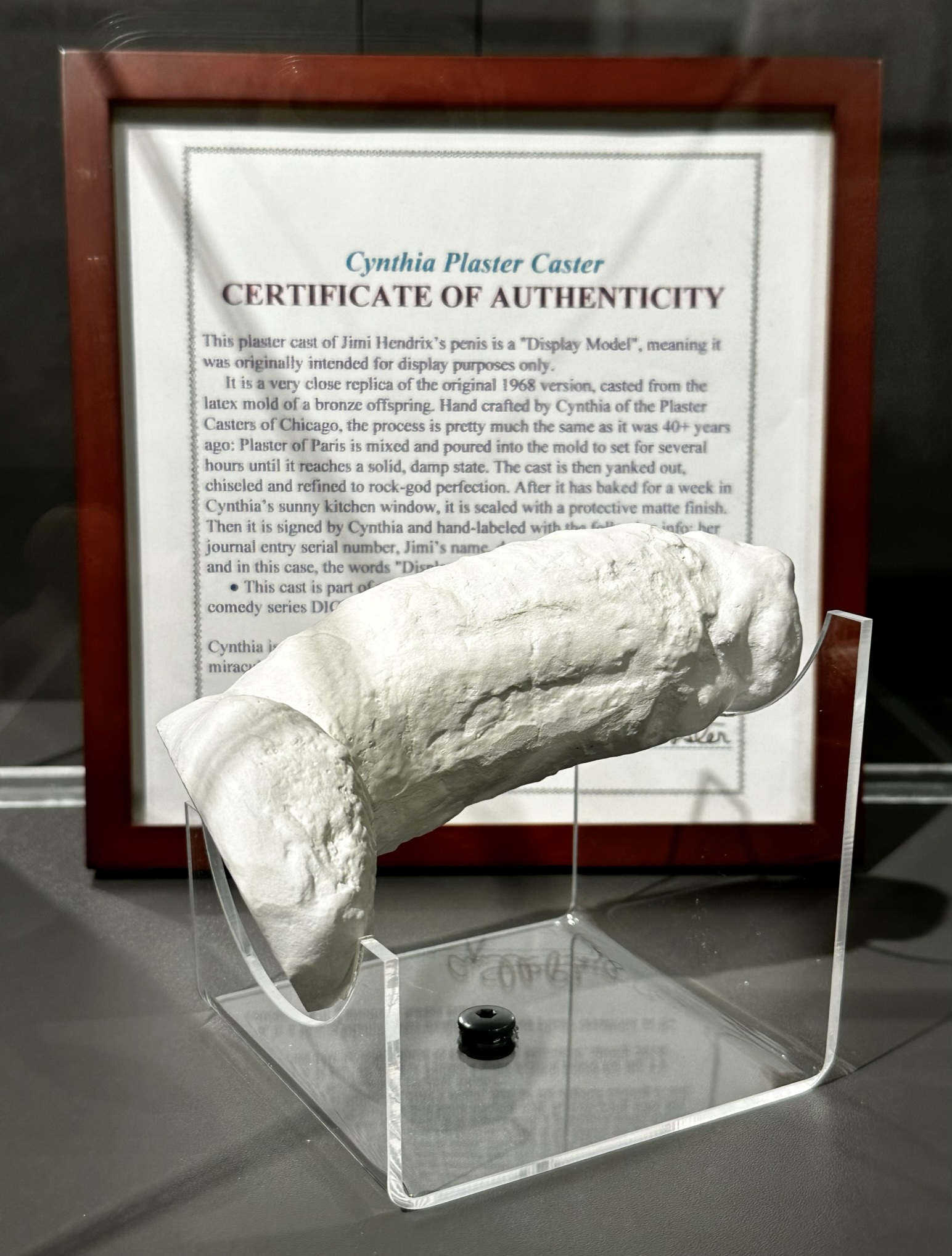
A plaster lifecast of Jimi Hendrix's penis, donated to the museum by Cynthia Plaster Caster.

His penis was given priority over those of the non-Icelandic donors in accordance with the museum's mission to display the organs of Icelandic mammals. Removing and preserving it was not an easy proposition, as Sigurður explained: "The donor and the doctors are in agreement, it must be taken while the body is warm. Then bleed it and pump it up. If it cools you can't do anything, so [the donor] is eager to have it taken warm and treated to be preserved with dignity."

In January 2011, the Icelandic donor died and his penis was surgically removed so that it could be added to the museum's collection. The penectomy was not entirely successful and left the penis "a greyish-brown, shrivelled mass". According to Sigurður, "I should have stretched it and sewn it at the back to keep it in more or less a normal position". Instead, it "went directly into the formaldehyde". Although disappointed with the results, Sigurður expressed confidence that "I will get a younger and a bigger and better one soon."

Visitors' most common reaction to the preserved human penis is "that it's very old, you know, a bit shrunken, and the male members [sic] say 'oh, I hope mine will not look like this when I get old.'" Sigurður has considered donating his own penis to the museum when he dies but said that it depends on his wife: "If she dies first, my specimen would go in here. If I die first, well I can't say. She might say no."

American writer and actor Jonah Falcon, known for his claim to an impressively sized penis, was invited by the museum via The Huffington Post to donate his member after his death. It was announced in May 2014 that Falcon had accepted the proposal, suggesting a display alongside a sperm whale to be called "Jonah and the whale", after the biblical story.

In May 2022, the museum announced that it would display a plaster cast of Jimi Hendrix's erect penis, created in 1968 in Chicago by Cynthia Plaster Caster. The famous groupie, whose real name was Cynthia Albritton, donated the item to the museum in April 2022, shortly before her death. In December 2024, the museum began displaying a cast Matt Barr sent in supposedly of his own erect penis.

== Film ==
The museum is the subject of The Final Member, a film by Canadian documentarians Zach Math and Jonah Bekhor. It profiles Sigurður and his quest to obtain a human penis for the museum, telling the story of the American and Icelandic donors and examining the quasi-taboo nature of the museum's collection. Bekhor says: "I wouldn't say it's a Rorschach test, but depending on how you react to it really says a lot about what your relationship is with that element of the human anatomy. It's a really interesting phenomenon and we're really curious to see how audiences respond." The film premiered on 1 May 2012 at the Hot Docs Canadian International Documentary Festival.

== See also ==
- List of museums in Iceland
- List of sex museums
- Vagina Museum
