= Diana Armstrong (world record holder) =

American world record holder for longest fingernails

- Born: 1958–59; United States
- Known for: World's longest female fingernails
- Awards: A Guinness World Records title

Diana Armstrong (born 1958 or 1959) is an American woman who holds the all-time Guinness World Record for longest fingernails on a pair of female hands at 42 feet 10.4 inches (1,306.6 cm). (Note: Melvin Boothe holds the all-time world record for longest fingernails on a pair of male hands (32 feet 3.8 inches; 985.0 cm).)

== Biography ==
Armstrong was born in either 1958 or 1959. She last cut her nails in 1997 while she was living in Chicago. That same year, her 17-year-old daughter Latisha died of an asthma attack. Latisha did Diana's nails so Diana decided to never cut them again. Armstrong's nails were already several inches long before she started growing them out. Armstrong was previously a hairstylist but became a stay-at-home mom to her other four kids after Latisha died. Ten years later, Armstrong started going to therapy and taking medication for depression and schizophrenia.

In 2022, Armstrong broke the all-time record previously held by Lee Redmond for longest fingernails on a pair of female hands. Armstrong also broke Ayanna Williams' record for longest female nails among currently living people.

As of March 12, 2022, the combined length of Armstrong's fingernails were 42 feet 10.4 inches (1,306.6 cm) Her right thumbnail (4 feet 6.7 inches; 138.9 cm) was her longest nail while her left pinky nail (3 feet 7 inches; 109 cm) was her shortest. The Minnesota Star Tribune said "her nails are cylindrical, thicker than the shaft of a golf club but thinner than the butt end of a pool cue. To the touch, they have a smooth, polished type of bumpiness, similar to a carrot." Her fingernails weigh 18 pounds (8.2 kg), 9 pounds (4.1 kg) on each hand. It takes two days for her grandchildren to do her nails.

Armstrong does not drive anymore due to her long nails. She reportedly has trouble doing other basic activities like zipping her clothes or tying shoes. Armstrong said she uses her toes to pick up things off the floor, and has to cross her hands to pick up the phone. As of 2024, Armstrong lived in Minneapolis. She has asthma.

== See also ==
- Shridhar Chillal, who holds the world record for longest fingernails on a single hand.
