= Blue whale penis =

Largest male sex organ in the animal kingdom

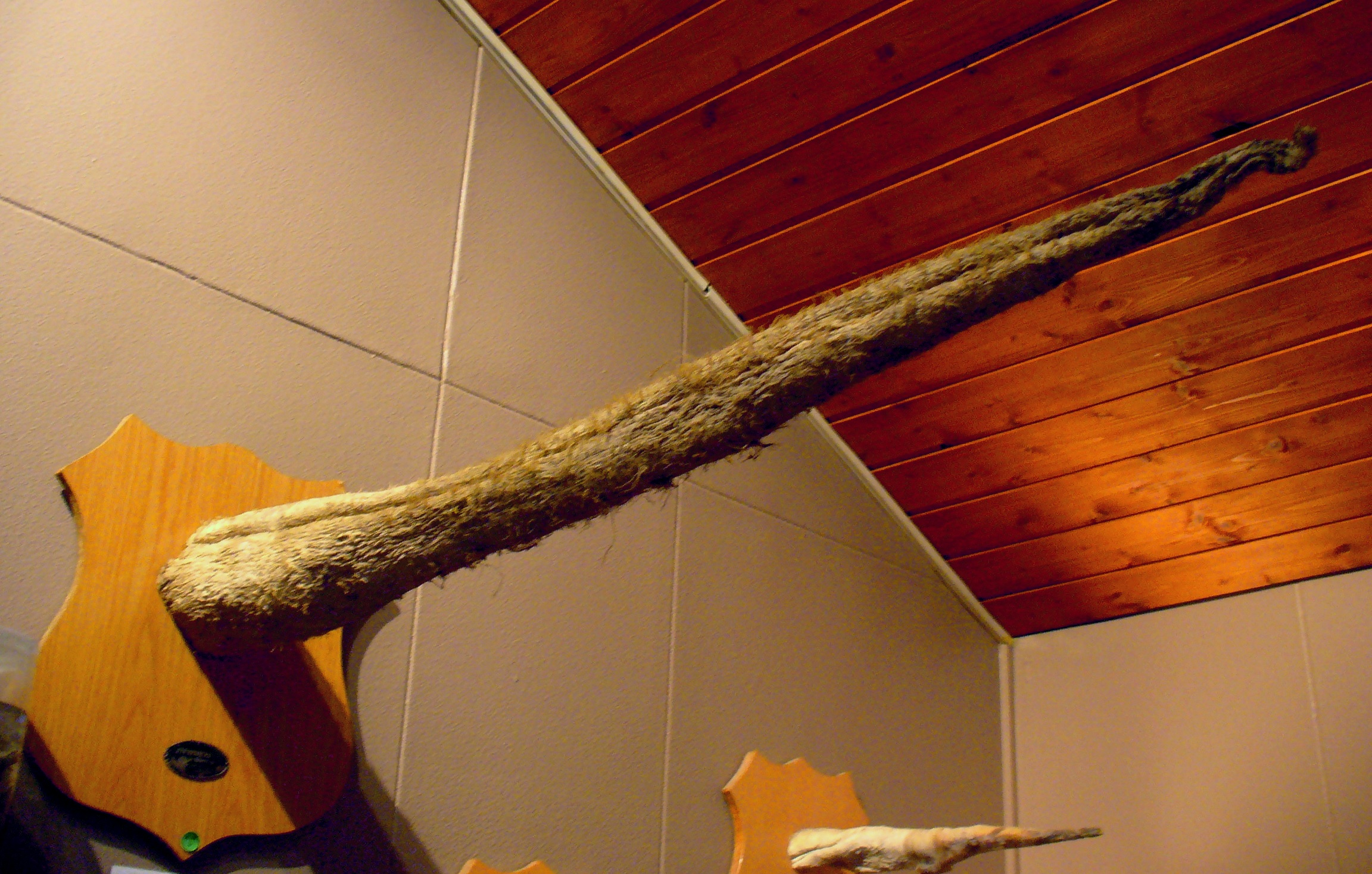
The dried tip of a blue whale penis, Icelandic Phallological Museum, Reykjavík, Iceland

The blue whale penis is the largest in the animal kingdom. It is commonly cited as having an average penis length of 2.5–3 metres (8.2–9.8 ft) and a diameter of 30 centimetres (12 in) to 36 centimetres (14 in).

== Morphology ==
The reported average penis length varies but is usually mentioned to have an average length of 2.5–3 metres (8.2–9.8 ft). The most common reported average length is roughly 3 metres (9.8 ft) but the average diameter is only 30 to 36 centimetres (12 to 14 in), making the penis proportionately very long and thin. However, its girth has also been reported to be nearer 46 centimetres (18 in), with a single ejaculation estimated to be about 35 US pints (17 L; 29 imp pt), based on the size of its testes each weighing 45 to 68 kilograms (99 to 150 lb).

"Average" for a blue whale penis, however, is difficult to gauge given that the penis is unlikely to be able to be measured during sexual intercourse. The penis of the blue whale is normally hidden inside its body and jets out through a genital slit during intercourse. They are stated to be tough and fibrous (more than in any other mammal). It is believed that it uses the elasticity of this tissue to get an erection, rather than blood flow, though this hypothesis has not been confirmed by any scientific study.

== Scientific studies ==
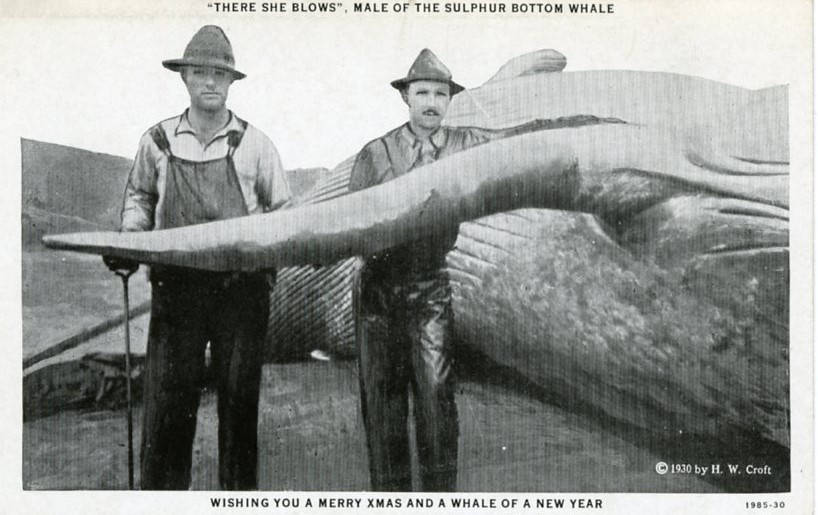
A 1930 postcard depicting two males with the penis of a male blue whale.

With whales, the length of the penis can be an indication of the maturity of the organism. Sei whales for instance are divided into categories such as immature, pubertal and mature. However, length is not the only factor as it is recorded in relation to the size of the whale's testes and its histology. For instance, research conducted off South Africa found that the longest penis of an immature categorized whale was 96 centimetres (38 in) and the smallest penis of a mature whale was 95 centimetres (37 in). By comparison the average blue whale penis is nearly 3 times the size of that of a sei whale. Specimen measurements indicate that a blue whale measuring 21.6 metres (71 ft) in length had a vestigial mammary slit of 40.6 centimetres (16.0 in) width and 48.2 centimetres (19.0 in) length, with a penis measurement of 1.83 metres (6.0 ft). In another specimen in which the length of the whale was 20 metres (66 ft) and weighed 50.9 metric tons, the brain weighed only 3.636 kilograms (8.02 lb).

"Blue whales have the largest penises on Earth. An erect blue whale penis is 12 inches (30 cm) in diameter and ten ft (3.0 m) in length. It is fibroelastic like those of the blue whale's artiodactyl relatives. The retracted penis curves in an S-shaped loop and stays inside the body. When erect, it peeks out of the genital slit. Blue whales also have a distal spiral valve as a spermatic tube. Cetaceans do not have scrotums like terrestrial mammalian males do. Mammalian scrotums lower ambient temperature to keep sperm viable, so cetaceans had to find a way to compensate. And they did. Blood in veins that go through fins and the fluke loses heat. When that blood is sent directly to the testes, the sperm are cooled below body temperature and remain viable. The females have a long vulva with two nipples on each side to nourish newborns. They go in heat any time of the year, but the most common is during the migration to warmer waters for mating season."
–"Balaenoptera musculus", University of Wisconsin

== Specimen ==
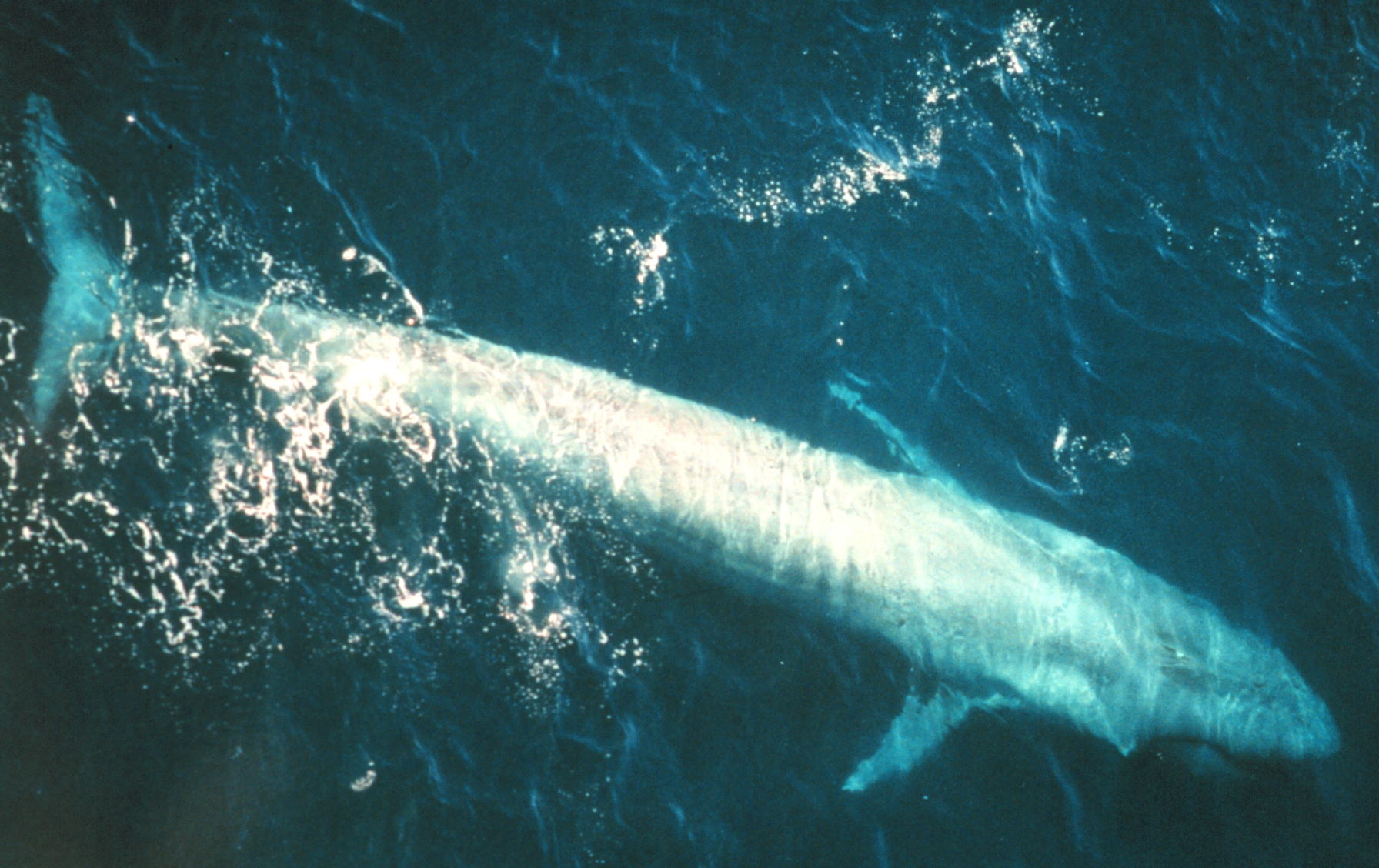
Blue whale

The Icelandic Phallological Museum houses a fragment of a blue whale penis measuring 3 feet (91 cm) long, which Icelandic reviews have dubbed the "Big Penis". However, the Icelandic Phallological Museum houses a sperm whale penis fragment measuring 170 cm (5 ft 7 in) long and weighing 70 kilograms (154 lb), suggesting the blue whale's penis isn't the largest. This sperm whale penis specimen is only the tip; if the entire organ were intact, it would have been around 5 m (16 ft) long and weighed around 400 kilograms (880 lb), significantly larger than the average blue whale. By comparison, an adult elephant's penis is the largest penis of any land animal at 1.8 metres (6 ft) on average.

== See also ==
- Largest body parts
