= Lee Redmond =

American former world record holder for longest fingernails

LeeAnn Redmond
- Born: February 2, 1941; Annabella, Utah, U.S.
- Died: December 14, 2023 (aged 82); Utah, U.S.
- Notable work: Longest fingernails record in Guinness World Records
- Children: 3

LeeAnn Redmond (February 2, 1941 in Annabella, Utah – December 14, 2023) was an American woman who held the all-time record in the Guinness World Records for longest fingernails on a pair of female hands. It was broken by Diana Armstrong in 2022.

== Guinness World Records ==
Right hand
Thumb	76.4 cm	30.1 in
Index finger	72.3 cm	28.5 in
Middle finger	74.1 cm	29.2 in
Ring finger	73.6 cm	29.0 in
Little finger	71.6 cm	28.2 in
Left hand
Thumb	80.0 cm	31.5 in
Index finger	76.4 cm	30.1 in
Middle finger	76.7 cm	30.2 in
Ring finger	76.2 cm	30.0 in
Little finger	73.6 cm	29.0 in
Total length
	751.3 cm	24 ft 7.8 in

The Enquirer featured her every few years and kept track of the progress of her nails.

Redmond started growing her nails in late 1978 to early 1979 and although she had originally planned to have them cut off on November 22, 2006 (as she said on her guest appearances on a couple of talk shows), she chose to keep her nails after all. In the past few years, she made appearances on CBS News and at the Ripley's Believe It or Not! museum. One of her last appearances was at a fundraiser for the Salt Lake City fire department, where it was reported her nails were an average of 86-89 centimetres (34–35 in) in length.

During the time when she had her long nails, she enjoyed activities such as riding bikes with her younger sister Sierra, who had normal nails. She stated that, while certain activities such as putting on a heavy coat were troublesome, she managed her daily life without much difficulty. On the Guinness TV feature, she was shown driving a car, vacuuming, doing dishes, and giving haircuts to her grandchildren.

On February 10, 2009, her record-setting nails were broken off when she was ejected from a car in a four-car pile-up in Holladay, Utah. Her injuries were serious, but not life-threatening.

In a Huffington Post story published on September 3, 2009, it was stated that: "Lee Redmond, who lost the fingernails in February, says it's now much easier to do things and her hands seem to fly with the weight of the nails gone. The 68-year-old won't grow her nails out again, saying it took 30 years the first time, and she may not live for another 30."

== Personal life ==
Redmond was born February 2, 1941 in Annabella, Utah to Glen (1917–2012) and Alice Case. She was raised in The Church of Jesus Christ of Latter-day Saints. resided in Salt Lake City, Utah. She had three children; four grandchildren, and two great-grandchildren.

Redmond stated that her long nails did not interfere with her care of her husband, who suffered from Alzheimer's disease.

Redmond died in Utah on December 14, 2023, at the age of 82.

== Filmography ==
=== Television ===
Year	Title	Role	Notes
2001	Ripley's Believe It or Not!	Herself	Guest appearance
	The Ellen DeGeneres Show	Herself	Guest appearance
2007	CBS News	Herself	Guest appearance

== See also ==
- Shridhar Chillal, who holds the world record for longest fingernails on a single hand.
