= Annabella, Utah =

- Town
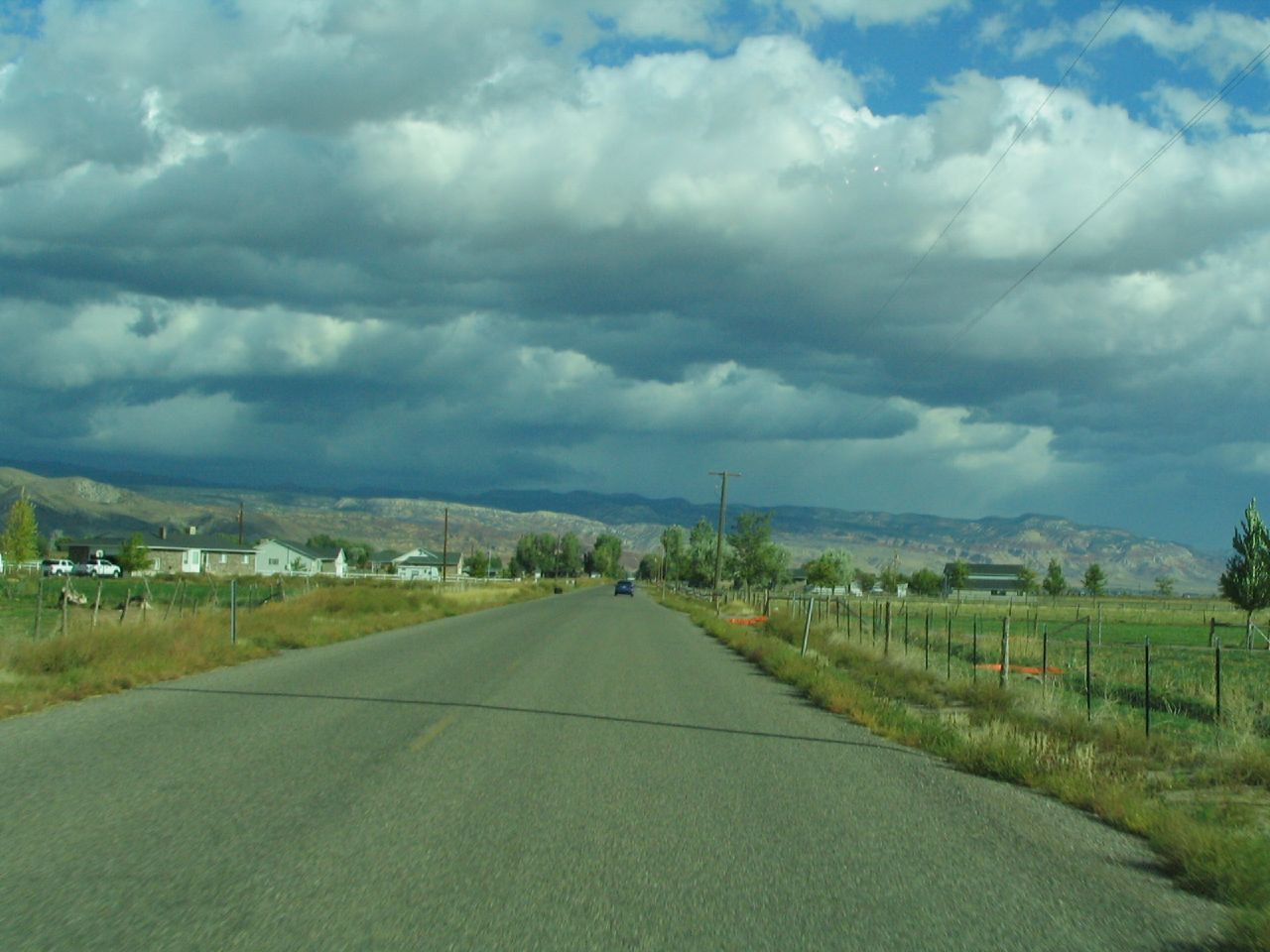

- Location in Sevier County and the state of Utah.
- Coordinates: 38°42′28″N 112°3′30″W
- Country: United States
- State: Utah
- County: Sevier
- Settled: 1871
- Named for: Ann S. Roberts and Isabella Dalton

Area
  - Total: 0.65 sq mi (1.69 km^{2})
  - Land: 0.65 sq mi (1.69 km^{2})
  - Water: 0 sq mi (0.00 km^{2})
- Elevation: 5,292 ft (1,613 m)

Population (2020)
  - Total: 836
  - Density: 1,242.6/sq mi (479.76/km^{2})
- Time zone: UTC-7 (MST)
  - Summer (DST): UTC-6 (MDT)
- ZIP code: 84711
- Area code: 435
- FIPS code: 49-01750
- GNIS feature ID: 1438228
- Website: annabella.utah.gov

Annabella is a town in Sevier County, Utah, United States. The population was 836 at the 2020 census, an increase over the 2010 figure of 795.

== History ==
The first two families to settle Omni Point in 1871 were Henry Dalton, a member of the Mormon Battalion, and Joseph Powell. Joseph Powell is undocumented and has been copied through time. The first name given to the settlement was Omni Point, because Richfield was called Omni. The "Point" was a high rise in the terrain, five miles directly south of Richfield. The town of Annabella was settled shortly after that, three miles to the North East of Omni Point by John Gleave and Edward Killick Roberts, along two creeks, which were named Cottonwood Creek and Annabella Springs. The town name was "Annabella", after two of the first women who settled there: Ann S. Roberts and Isabella Dalton. Isabella Dalton lived at Omni Point and died in 1873, two years after settlement. There is no memorial to her burial. She was likely buried at the Omni Point homestead. Henry Dalton moved his family shortly after that to Kanosh. Several married Daltons had settled and remained in Annabella.

== Geography ==
According to the United States Census Bureau, the town has a total area of 0.6 square miles (1.5 km^{2}), all land.

== Demographics ==
Historical population
Census	Pop.	Note	%±
1880	205		—
1890	280		36.6%
1900	378		35.0%
1910	331		−12.4%
1920	345		4.2%
1930	335		−2.9%
1940	351		4.8%
1950	263		−25.1%
1960	177		−32.7%
1970	221		24.9%
1980	463		109.5%
1990	487		5.2%
2000	669		37.4%
2010	795		18.8%
2020	836		5.2%
U.S. Decennial Census

As of the census of 2000, there were 643 people, 186 households, and 165 families residing in the town. The population density was 1,083.5 people per square mile (415.7/km^{2}). There were 203 housing units at an average density of 364.8 per square mile (140.0/km^{2}). The racial makeup of the town was 97.18% White, 0.50% Native American, 1.49% from other races, and 0.83% from two or more races. Hispanic or Latino of any race were 1.49% of the population.

There were 186 households, out of which 46.2% had children under the age of 18 living with them, 79.6% were married couples living together, 6.5% had a female householder with no husband present, and 10.8% were non-families. 10.2% of all households were made up of individuals, and 5.9% had someone living alone who was 65 years of age or older. The average household size was 3.24, and the average family size was 3.47.

In the town, the population was spread out, with 35.0% under 18, 10.8% from 18 to 24, 20.7% from 25 to 44, 25.4% from 45 to 64, and 8.1% who were 65 years of age or older. The median age was 30 years. For every 100 females, there were 99.0 males. For every 100 females aged 18 and over, there were 99.0 males.

The median income for a household in the town was $40,000, and the median income for a family was $42,500. Males had a median income of $35,662 versus $19,375 for females. The per capita income was $13,531. About 7.1% of families and 8.2% of the population were below the poverty line, including 11.4% of those under age 18 and none of those age 65 or over.

== Notable people ==
- Virgil Carter (birthplace), former NFL quarterback

== See also ==
- List of cities and towns in Utah
