= List of mammals of Iceland =

This is a list of the mammal species recorded in Iceland. There are twenty-eight mammal species in Iceland, of which four are endangered and four are vulnerable. The only native land mammal, not including vagrant species, is the Arctic fox. This list is derived from the IUCN Red List which lists species of mammals and includes those mammals that have recently been classified as extinct (since 1500 AD).

Icons which state each species' global IUCN status:
| CR | Critically Endangered | In imminent risk of extinction in the wild |
| EN | Endangered | Facing an extremely high risk of extinction in the wild |
| VU | Vulnerable | Facing a high risk of extinction in the wild |
| NT | Near Threatened | Doesn't meet any criteria that would categorise it as risking extinction but likely to in the future |
| LC | Least Concern | No current identifiable risks to this species |
| DD | Data Deficient | Inadequate information to make an assessment of the risks to this species |

== Order: Rodentia (rodents) ==
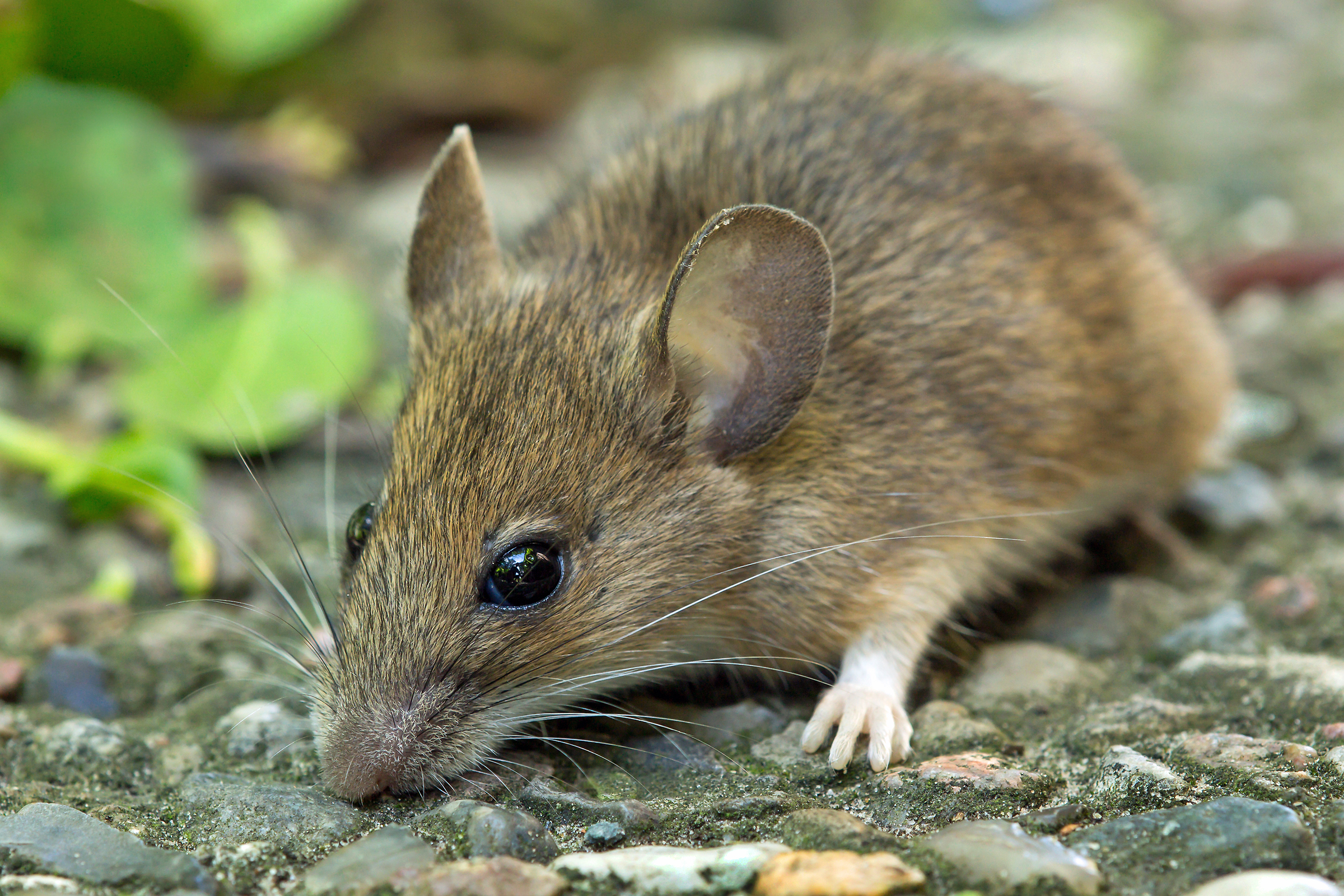
Wood mouse

Rodents make up the largest order of mammals, with over 40% of mammalian species. They have two incisors in the upper and lower jaw which grow continually and must be kept short by gnawing.

- Suborder: Myomorpha
  - Family: Muridae (mice, rats, gerbils, etc.)
    - Subfamily: Murinae
      - Genus: Apodemus
        - Wood mouse, Apodemus sylvaticus LC introduced c. 10th century
      - Genus: Mus
        - House mouse, Mus musculus LC introduced
      - Genus: Rattus
        - Brown rat, Rattus norvegicus LC introduced
        - Black rat, R. rattus LC introduced

== Order: Lagomorpha (rabbits, hares and pikas) ==
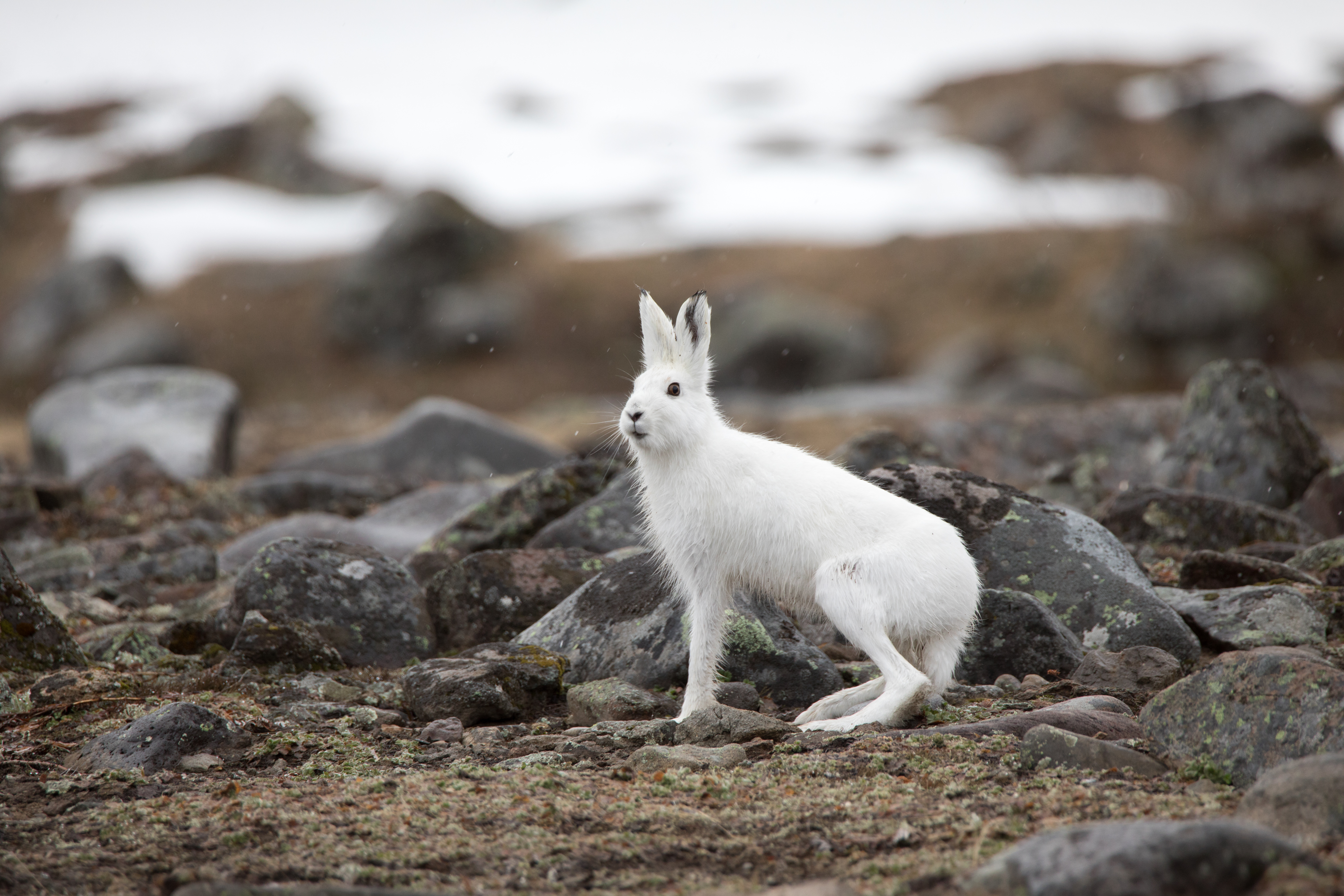
Mountain hare in winter pelage

The lagomorphs comprise two families, Leporidae (hares and rabbits), and Ochotonidae (pikas). Though they can resemble rodents, and were classified as a superfamily in that order until the early 20th century, they have since been considered a separate order. They differ from rodents in a number of physical characteristics, such as having four incisors in the upper jaw rather than two.

- Family: Leporidae (rabbits, hares)
  - Genus: Oryctolagus
    - European rabbit, O. cuniculus NT introduced
  - Genus: Lepus
    - Mountain hare, L. timidus LC introduced

== Order: Cetacea (whales) ==
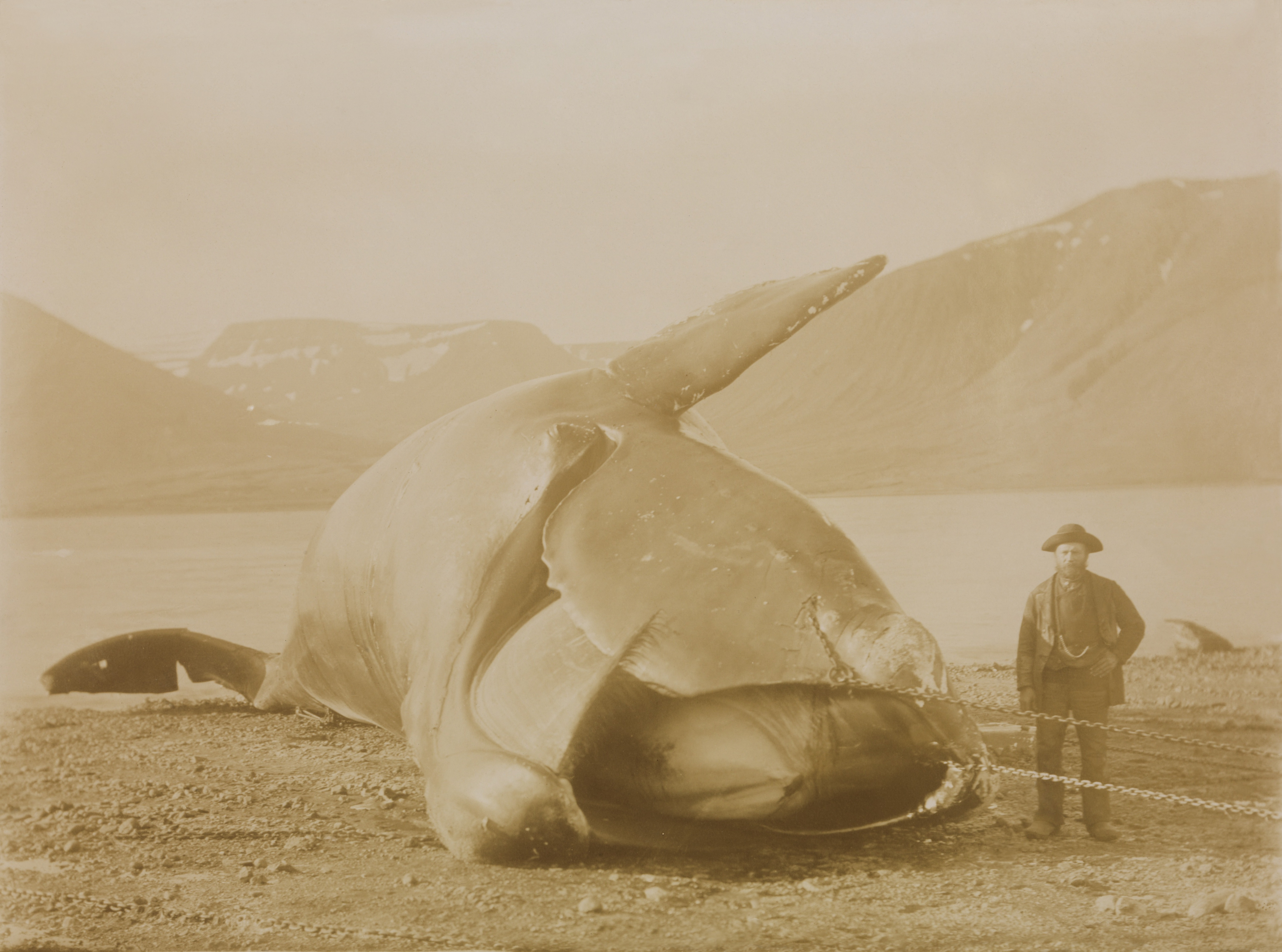
Eubalaena glacialis landed in Dýrafjörður possibly taken by Captain L. Berg during a research expedition to the Norwegian Sea, Iceland and Jan Mayen in the 19th century, by Fridtjof Nansen

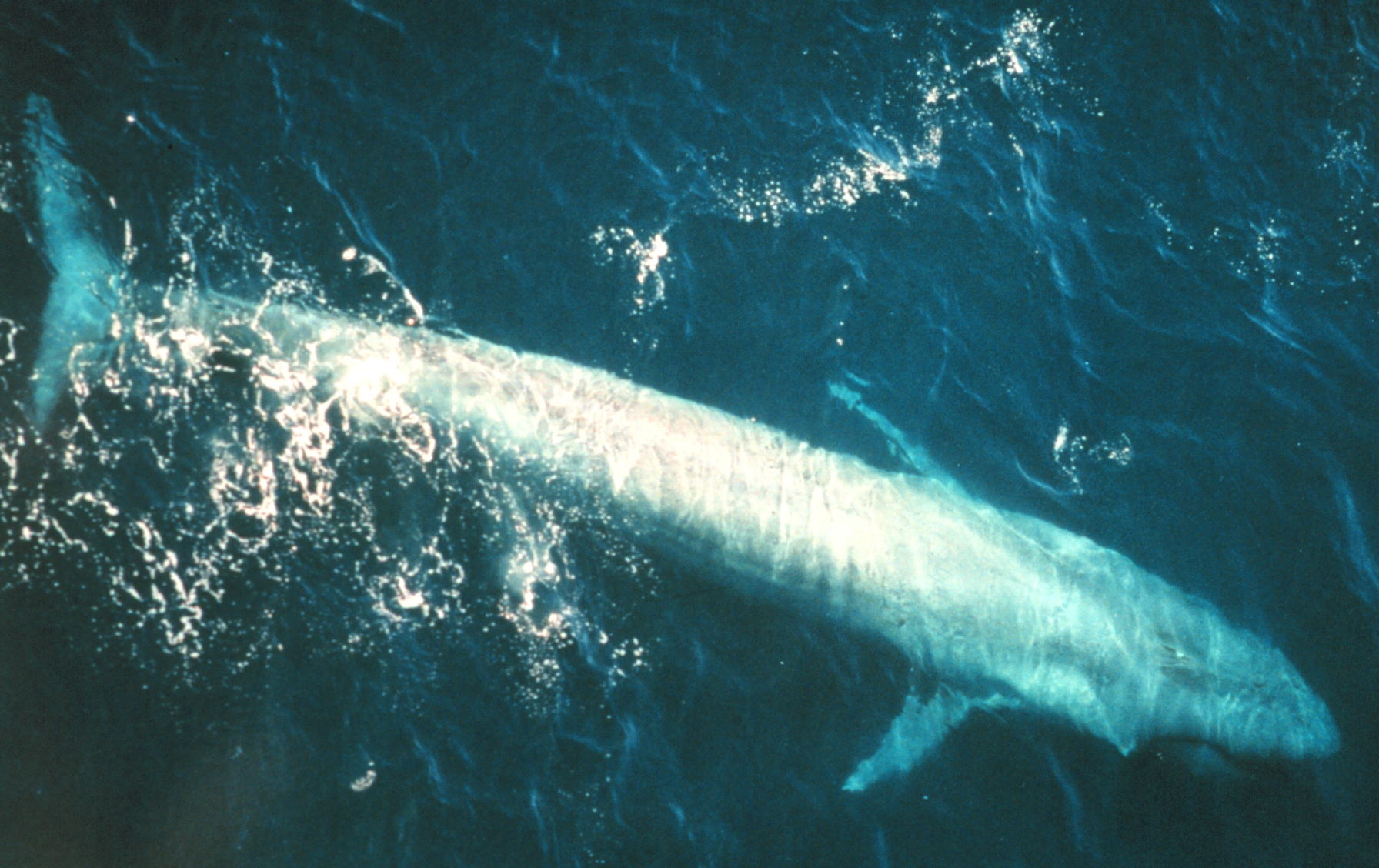
Blue whale

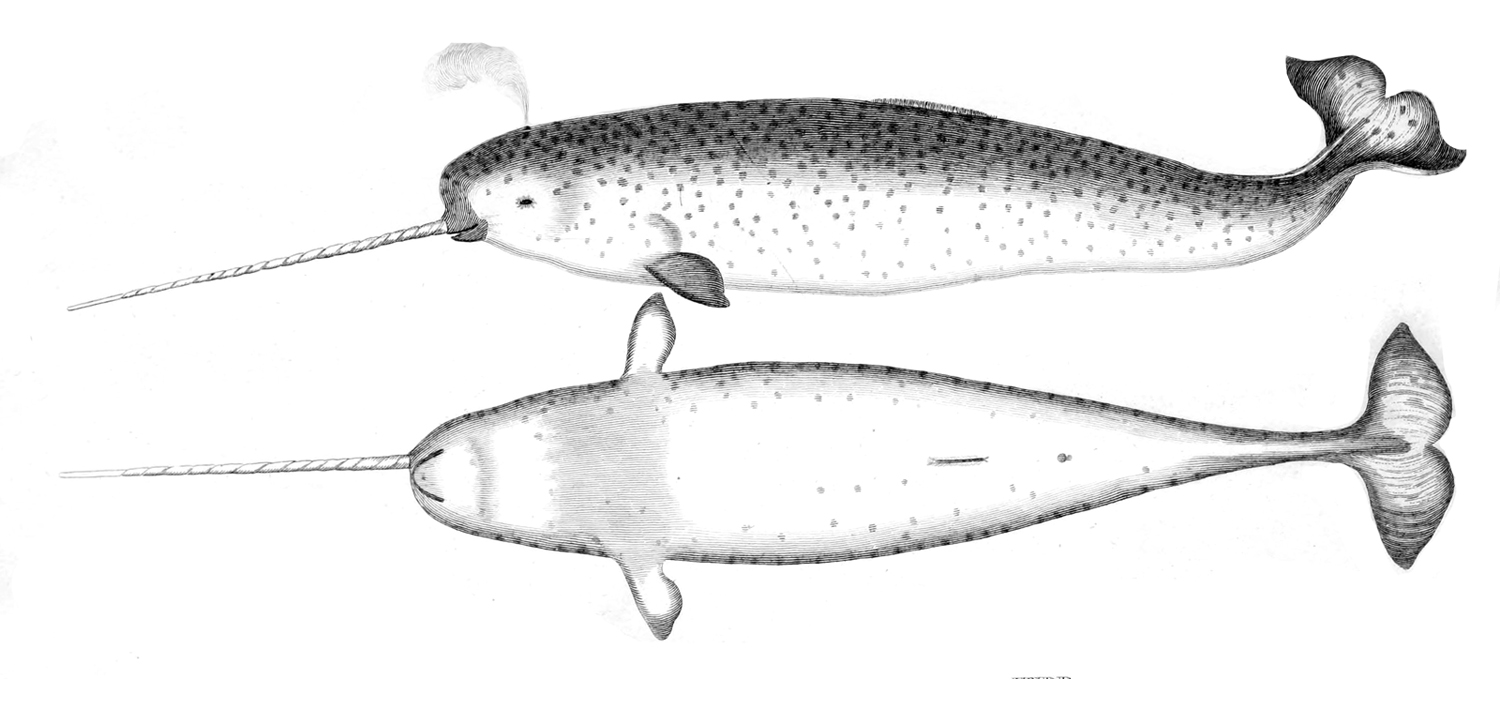
Narwhal

The order Cetacea includes whales, dolphins and porpoises. They are the mammals most fully adapted to aquatic life with a spindle-shaped nearly hairless body, protected by a thick layer of blubber, and forelimbs and tail modified to provide propulsion underwater.

- Suborder: Mysticeti
  - Family: Balaenidae
    - Genus: Balaena
      - Bowhead whale, Balaena mysticetus LC
    - Genus: Eubalaena
      - North Atlantic right whale, Eubalaena glacialis CR
  - Family: Eschrichtiidae
    - Genus: Eschrichtius
      - Gray whale, Eschrichtius robustus LC extirpated from Iceland
  - Family: Balaenopteridae
    - Subfamily: Balaenopterinae
      - Genus: Balaenoptera
        - Common minke whale, Balaenoptera acutorostrata LC
        - Sei whale, Balaenoptera borealis EN
        - Blue whale, Balaenoptera musculus EN
        - Fin whale, Balaenoptera physalus VU
    - Subfamily: Megapterinae
      - Genus: Megaptera
        - Humpback whale, Megaptera novaeangliae LC
    - Family: Phocoenidae
      - Genus: Phocoena
        - Harbour porpoise, Phocoena phocoena LC
    - Family: Ziphidae
      - Subfamily: Hyperoodontinae
        - Genus: Hyperoodon
          - Northern bottlenose whale, Hyperoodon ampullatus NT
        - Genus: Mesoplodon
          - Sowerby's beaked whale, Mesoplodon bidens LC
    - Family: Delphinidae (marine dolphins)
      - Genus: Delphinus
        - Short-beaked common dolphin, Delphinus delphis LC vagrant
      - Genus: Stenella
        - Striped dolphin, Stenella coeruleoalba LC
      - Genus: Tursiops
        - Common bottlenose dolphin, Tursiops truncatus LC
      - Genus: Grampus
        - Risso's dolphin, Grampus griseus LC
      - Genus: Lagenorhynchus
        - White-beaked dolphin, Lagenorhynchus albirostris LC
        - Atlantic white-sided dolphin, Lagenorhynchus acutus LC
      - Genus: Orcinus
        - Orca, Orcinus orca DD
      - Genus: Globicephala
        - Long-finned pilot whale, Globicephala melas LC
    - Family: Monodontidae
      - Genus: Delphinapterus
        - Beluga whale, Delphinapterus leucas LC
      - Genus: Monodon
        - Narwhal, Monodon monoceros LC
    - Family: Physeteridae
      - Genus: Physeter
        - Sperm whale, Physeter macrocephalus VU

== Order: Carnivora (carnivorans) ==
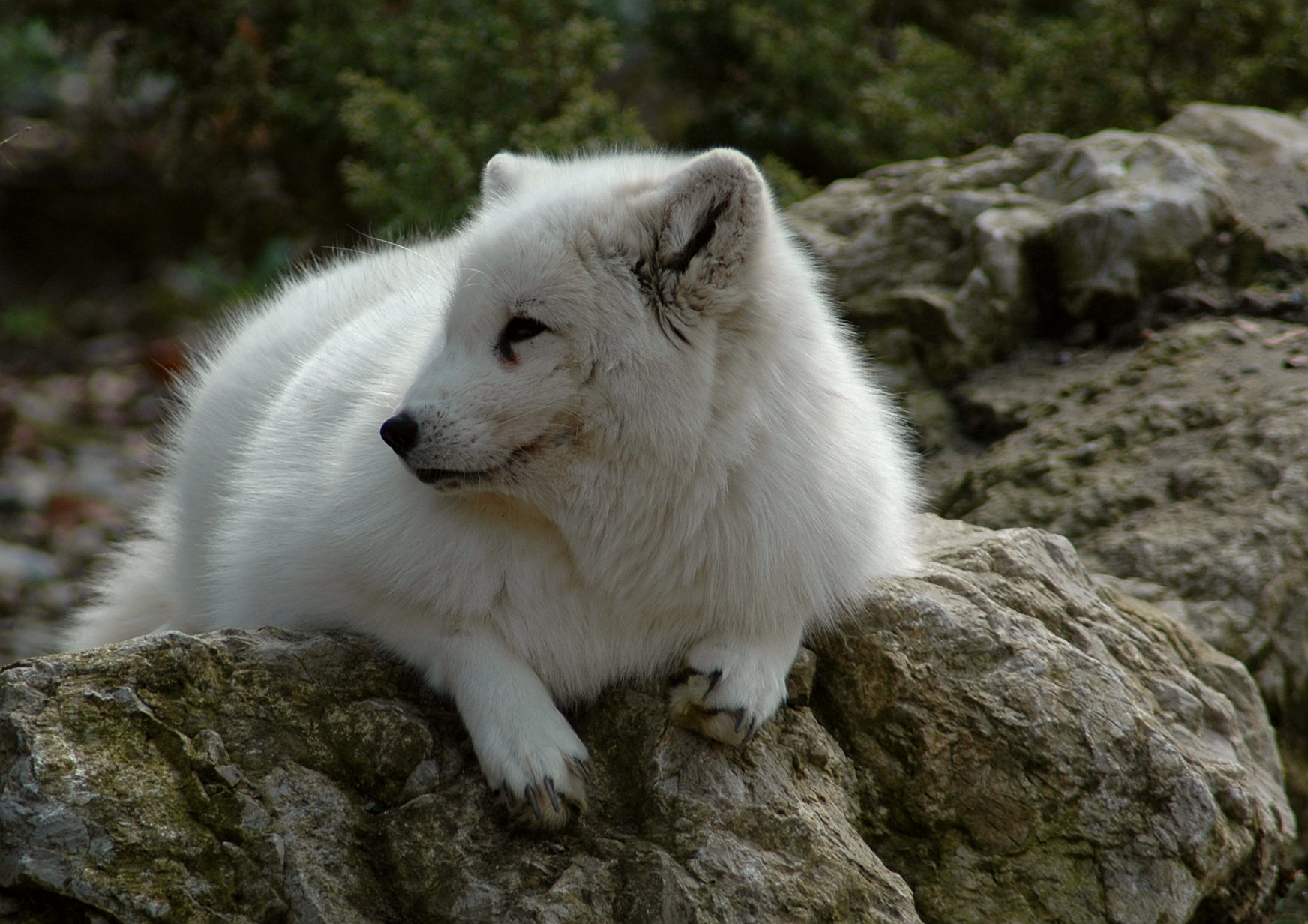
Arctic fox

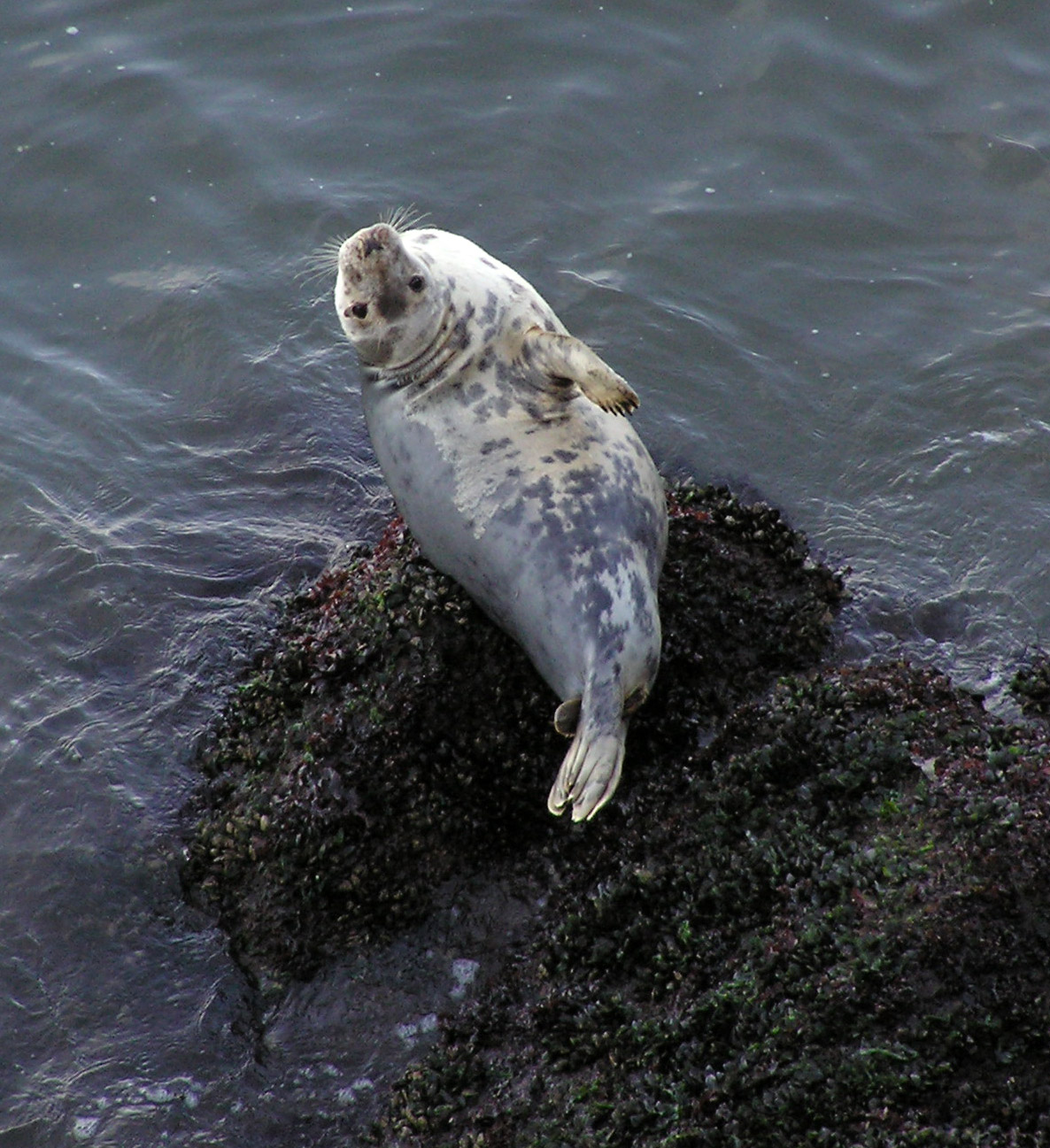
Grey seal

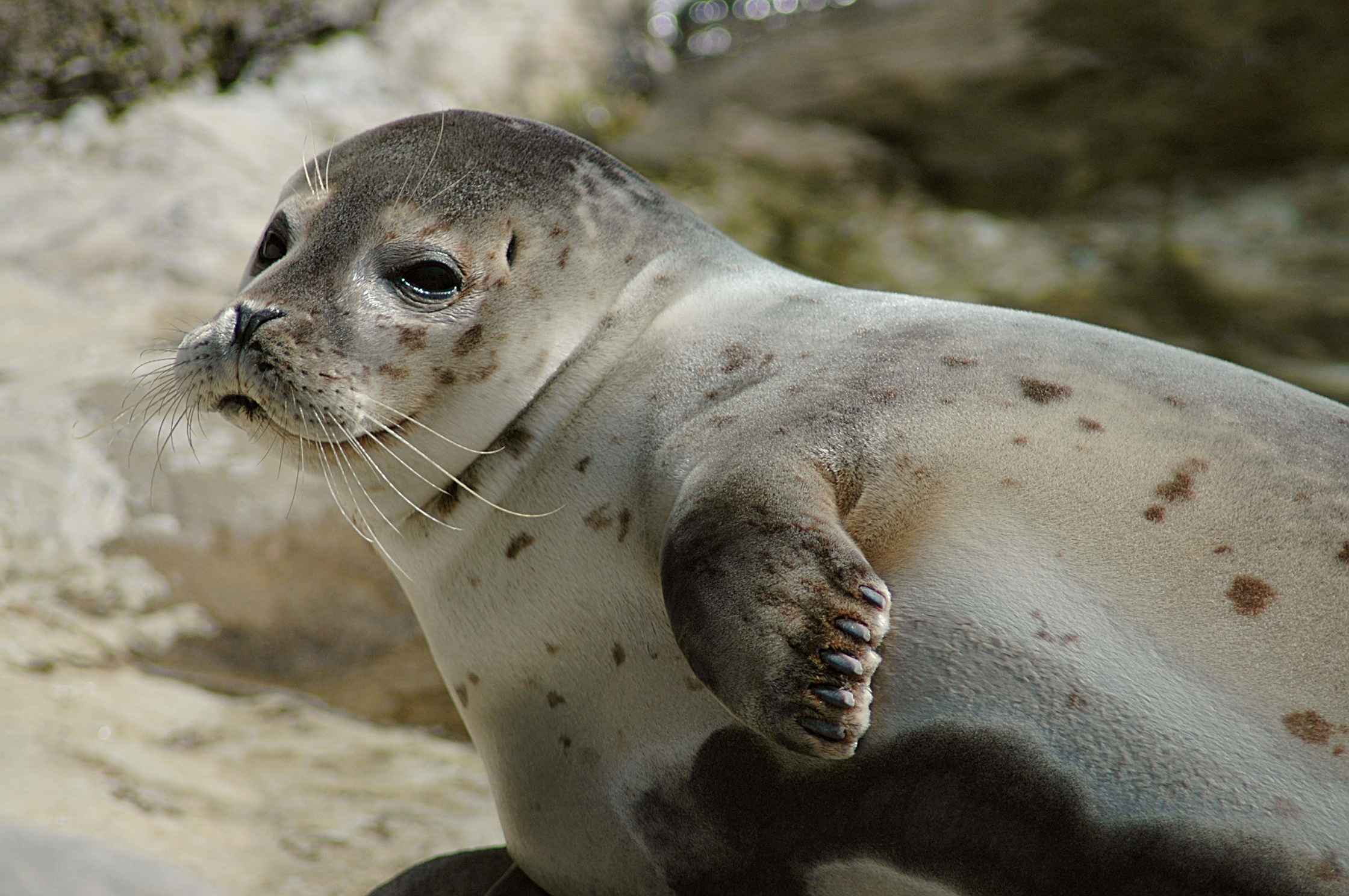
Common seal

There are over 260 species of carnivorans, the majority of which feed primarily on meat. They have a characteristic skull shape and dentition.

- Suborder: Caniformia
  - Family: Canidae (dogs, foxes)
    - Genus: Vulpes
      - Arctic fox, Vulpes lagopus LC
  - Family: Phocidae (earless seals)
    - Genus: Cystophora
      - Hooded seal, Cystophora cristata EN
    - Genus: Erignathus
      - Bearded seal, Erignathus barbatus NT
    - Genus: Halichoerus
      - Grey seal, Halichoerus grypus LC
    - Genus: Pagophilus
      - Harp seal, Pagophilus groenlandicus NT
    - Genus: Phoca
      - Common seal, Phoca vitulina LC
  - Family: Mustelidae (weasels, allies)
    - Genus: Neogale
      - American mink, Neogale vison LC introduced
  - Family: Ursidae (bears)
    - Genus: Ursus
      - Polar bear, Ursus maritimus VU vagrant

== Order: Artiodactyla (even-toed ungulates) ==
The even-toed ungulates are ungulates whose weight is borne about equally by the third and fourth toes, rather than mostly or entirely by the third as in perissodactyls. There are about 220 artiodactyl species, including many that are of great economic importance to humans.

- Family: Cervidae (deer)
  - Subfamily: Capreolinae
    - Genus: Rangifer
      - Reindeer, Rangifer tarandus VU introduced

== Order: Chiroptera (bats) ==
Bats have been increasingly recorded in Iceland where they are thought to be either vagrants or artificially introduced. The bats' most distinguishing feature is that their forelimbs are developed as wings, making them the only mammals capable of flight. Bat species account for about 20% of all mammals.

- Family: Vespertilionidae
  - Subfamily: Myotinae
    - Genus: Myotis
      - Little brown bat, M. lucifugus EN vagrant or introduced
      - Northern long-eared bat, M. septentrionalis NT vagrant or introduced
  - Subfamily: Vespertilioninae
    - Genus: Eptesicus
      - Big brown bat, E. fuscus LC vagrant or introduced
    - Genus: Lasiurus
      - Hoary bat, L. cinereus LC vagrant or introduced
    - Genus: Nyctalus
      - Common noctule, N. noctula LC vagrant or introduced
      - Lesser noctule, N. leisleri LC vagrant or introduced
    - Genus: Pipistrellus
      - Nathusius' pipistrelle, P. nathusii LC vagrant or introduced
    - Genus: Vespertilio
      - Parti-coloured bat, V. murinus LC vagrant or introduced

== Locally extinct species ==
Walrus in the 12th and 13th centuries Grey whale in the 17th century

== See also ==
- List of chordate orders
- Lists of mammals by region
- List of prehistoric mammals
- Mammal classification
- New mammal species
