= Giant animal =

Giant animal may refer to:

- Megafauna, the largest animal species
- Megafauna (mythology), large animals in mythology
- Gigantism in animals

== See also ==
- Largest organisms
- Largest prehistoric organisms
