= Shridhar Chillal =

Indian photographer famous for long fingernails

- Born: 29 January 1937 (age 89); Poona, Bombay Presidency, British Raj
- Occupation: Photographer

Shridhar Chillal (born 29 January 1937) is an Indian former photographer. He is best known for holding the world record for the longest fingernails ever reached on a single hand, with a combined length of 909.6 centimeters (358.1 inches). Chillal's longest single nail was his thumbnail, which measured 197.8 centimeters (77.87 inches). He stopped cutting his nails in 1952.

Although proud of his record-breaking nails, Chillal had faced increasing difficulties due to the weight of his finger nails, including disfigurement of his fingers and loss of function in his left hand. He claims that nerve damage to his left arm from the nails' immense weight has also caused deafness in his left ear. He appeared in Jackass 2.5, where he displayed his nails.

On 11 July 2018, Chillal had his fingernails cut with a power tool at the Ripley's Believe It or Not! museum in New York City, where the nails were put on display. A technician wearing protective gear cut the nails during a "nail clipping ceremony". Three of his fingernails are currently on display at Ripley’s Believe It or Not museum in Amsterdam, The Netherlands.

== See also ==
- Diana Armstrong, who holds the world record for longest fingernails on a pair of female hands.
