= List of MeSH codes (D03) =

The following is a partial list of the "D" codes for Medical Subject Headings (MeSH), as defined by the United States National Library of Medicine (NLM).

This list continues the information at List of MeSH codes (D02). Codes following these are found at List of MeSH codes (D04). For other MeSH codes, see List of MeSH codes.

The source for this content is the set of 2006 MeSH Trees from the NLM.

== MeSH D03 – heterocyclic compounds ==
=== MeSH D03.066 – acids, heterocyclic ===
==== MeSH D03.066.288 – indoleacetic acids ====
- MeSH D03.066.288.200 – etodolac
- MeSH D03.066.288.478 – hydroxyindoleacetic acid

==== MeSH D03.066.349 – isonicotinic acids ====
- MeSH D03.066.349.220 – ethionamide
- MeSH D03.066.349.390 – iproniazid
- MeSH D03.066.349.410 – isoniazid
- MeSH D03.066.349.490 – nialamide
- MeSH D03.066.349.570 – prothionamide
- MeSH D03.066.349.600 – pyridoxic acid

==== MeSH D03.066.399 – isonipecotic acids ====
- MeSH D03.066.399.300 – diphenoxylate
- MeSH D03.066.399.450 – meperidine
- MeSH D03.066.399.450.700 – promedol
- MeSH D03.066.399.600 – phenoperidine
- MeSH D03.066.399.650 – pirinitramide

==== MeSH D03.066.515 – nicotinic acids ====
- MeSH D03.066.515.292 – arecoline
- MeSH D03.066.515.375 – clonixin
- MeSH D03.066.515.400 – etazolate
- MeSH D03.066.515.475 – niacin
- MeSH D03.066.515.530 – niacinamide
- MeSH D03.066.515.530.248 – 6-aminonicotinamide
- MeSH D03.066.515.530.498 – nicorandil
- MeSH D03.066.515.530.500 – nikethamide
- MeSH D03.066.515.540 – niceritrol
- MeSH D03.066.515.550 – niflumic acid
- MeSH D03.066.515.635 – pipemidic acid
- MeSH D03.066.515.650 – piromidic acid
- MeSH D03.066.515.950 – xanthinol niacinate

==== MeSH D03.066.707 – picolinic acids ====
- MeSH D03.066.707.200 – fusaric acid
- MeSH D03.066.707.523 – picloram
- MeSH D03.066.707.768 – streptonigrin

==== MeSH D03.066.942 – xanthurenates ====
- MeSH D03.066.942.505 – kynurenic acid

=== MeSH D03.132 – alkaloids ===
==== MeSH D03.132.052 – amaryllidaceae alkaloids ====
- MeSH D03.132.052.500 – galantamine

==== MeSH D03.132.070 – aporphines ====
- MeSH D03.132.070.290 – apomorphine

==== MeSH D03.132.117 – berberine alkaloids ====
- MeSH D03.132.117.100 – berberine

==== MeSH D03.132.151 – camptothecin ====
- MeSH D03.132.151.850 – topotecan

==== MeSH D03.132.206 – cinchona alkaloids ====
- MeSH D03.132.206.636 – quinidine
- MeSH D03.132.206.719 – quinine

==== MeSH D03.132.225 – colchicine ====
- MeSH D03.132.225.374 – demecolcine
- MeSH D03.132.225.500 – lumicolchicines

==== MeSH D03.132.327 – ergot alkaloids ====
- MeSH D03.132.327.287 – ergolines
- MeSH D03.132.327.287.262 – ergonovine
- MeSH D03.132.327.287.262.455 – methylergonovine
- MeSH D03.132.327.287.417 – lisuride
- MeSH D03.132.327.287.572 – lysergic acid
- MeSH D03.132.327.287.572.522 – lysergic acid diethylamide
- MeSH D03.132.327.287.630 – metergoline
- MeSH D03.132.327.287.689 – methysergide
- MeSH D03.132.327.287.730 – nicergoline
- MeSH D03.132.327.287.800 – pergolide
- MeSH D03.132.327.412 – ergotamines
- MeSH D03.132.327.412.100 – bromocriptine
- MeSH D03.132.327.412.150 – dihydroergocornine
- MeSH D03.132.327.412.175 – dihydroergocristine
- MeSH D03.132.327.412.200 – dihydroergocryptine
- MeSH D03.132.327.412.225 – dihydroergotamine
- MeSH D03.132.327.412.250 – dihydroergotoxine
- MeSH D03.132.327.412.250.500 – ergoloid mesylates
- MeSH D03.132.327.412.400 – ergotamine

==== MeSH D03.132.436 – indole alkaloids ====
- MeSH D03.132.436.255 – curare
- MeSH D03.132.436.255.712 – toxiferine
- MeSH D03.132.436.255.712.050 – alcuronium
- MeSH D03.132.436.255.847 – tubocurarine
- MeSH D03.132.436.444 – harmaline
- MeSH D03.132.436.477 – harmine
- MeSH D03.132.436.545 – physostigmine
- MeSH D03.132.436.613 – psilocybine
- MeSH D03.132.436.681 – secologanin tryptamine alkaloids
- MeSH D03.132.436.681.077 – ajmaline
- MeSH D03.132.436.681.077.650 – prajmaline
- MeSH D03.132.436.681.333 – ellipticines
- MeSH D03.132.436.681.444 – ibogaine
- MeSH D03.132.436.681.722 – strychnine
- MeSH D03.132.436.681.827 – vinca alkaloids
- MeSH D03.132.436.681.827.650 – vinblastine
- MeSH D03.132.436.681.827.750 – vincamine
- MeSH D03.132.436.681.827.817 – vincristine
- MeSH D03.132.436.681.827.830 – vindesine
- MeSH D03.132.436.681.933 – yohimbine
- MeSH D03.132.436.681.933.500 – reserpine
- MeSH D03.132.436.750 – staurosporine

==== MeSH D03.132.610 – opium ====
- MeSH D03.132.610.422 – morphinans
- MeSH D03.132.610.422.106 – benzomorphans
- MeSH D03.132.610.422.106.700 – pentazocine
- MeSH D03.132.610.422.106.715 – phenazocine
- MeSH D03.132.610.422.150 – buprenorphine
- MeSH D03.132.610.422.165 – butorphanol
- MeSH D03.132.610.422.235 – dextrorphan
- MeSH D03.132.610.422.250 – diprenorphine
- MeSH D03.132.610.422.270 – etorphine
- MeSH D03.132.610.422.413 – levallorphan
- MeSH D03.132.610.422.463 – levorphanol
- MeSH D03.132.610.422.463.382 – dextromethorphan
- MeSH D03.132.610.422.547 – morphine
- MeSH D03.132.610.422.547.547 – morphine derivatives
- MeSH D03.132.610.422.547.547.149 – codeine
- MeSH D03.132.610.422.547.547.149.287 – hydrocodone
- MeSH D03.132.610.422.547.547.149.575 – oxycodone
- MeSH D03.132.610.422.547.547.350 – dihydromorphine
- MeSH D03.132.610.422.547.547.430 – ethylmorphine
- MeSH D03.132.610.422.547.547.445 – heroin
- MeSH D03.132.610.422.547.547.450 – hydromorphone
- MeSH D03.132.610.422.547.547.692 – oxymorphone
- MeSH D03.132.610.422.547.547.856 – thebaine
- MeSH D03.132.610.422.606 – nalbuphine
- MeSH D03.132.610.422.656 – nalorphine
- MeSH D03.132.610.422.706 – naloxone
- MeSH D03.132.610.422.706.550 – naltrexone
- MeSH D03.132.610.568 – noscapine
- MeSH D03.132.610.710 – papaverine
- MeSH D03.132.610.710.850 – tetrahydropapaveroline

==== MeSH D03.132.716 – pyrrolizidine alkaloids ====
- MeSH D03.132.716.500 – monocrotaline

==== MeSH D03.132.760 – solanaceous alkaloids ====
- MeSH D03.132.760.180 – belladonna alkaloids
- MeSH D03.132.760.180.297 – atropine
- MeSH D03.132.760.180.848 – scopolamine
- MeSH D03.132.760.200 – capsaicin
- MeSH D03.132.760.570 – nicotine
- MeSH D03.132.760.769 – solanine
- MeSH D03.132.760.864 – tomatine

==== MeSH D03.132.889 – tropanes ====
- MeSH D03.132.889.180 – belladonna alkaloids
- MeSH D03.132.889.180.297 – atropine
- MeSH D03.132.889.180.297.297 – atropine derivatives
- MeSH D03.132.889.180.297.297.400 – ipratropium
- MeSH D03.132.889.244 – benztropine
- MeSH D03.132.889.354 – cocaine
- MeSH D03.132.889.354.250 – crack cocaine
- MeSH D03.132.889.848 – scopolamine
- MeSH D03.132.889.848.661 – scopolamine derivatives
- MeSH D03.132.889.848.661.200 – butylscopolammonium bromide
- MeSH D03.132.889.848.661.550 – n-methylscopolamine

==== MeSH D03.132.920 – veratrum alkaloids ====
- MeSH D03.132.920.256 – cevanes
- MeSH D03.132.920.256.310 – germine acetates
- MeSH D03.132.920.256.543 – protoveratrines
- MeSH D03.132.920.256.815 – veratrine
- MeSH D03.132.920.256.815.850 – veratridine

=== MeSH D03.383 – heterocyclic compounds, 1-ring ===
==== MeSH D03.383.066 – azepines ====
- MeSH D03.383.066.150 – caprolactam
- MeSH D03.383.066.200 – dilazep
- MeSH D03.383.066.400 – meptazinol
- MeSH D03.383.066.498 – oxazepines
- MeSH D03.383.066.600 – pentylenetetrazole
- MeSH D03.383.066.785 – thiazepines
- MeSH D03.383.066.985 – zolazepam

==== MeSH D03.383.082 – azetines ====
- MeSH D03.383.082.301 – azetidines
- MeSH D03.383.082.301.100 – azetidinecarboxylic acid

==== MeSH D03.383.097 – azirines ====
- MeSH D03.383.097.217 – aziridines
- MeSH D03.383.097.217.300 – carbazilquinone
- MeSH D03.383.097.217.900 – triaziquone
- MeSH D03.383.097.217.924 – triethylenemelamine
- MeSH D03.383.097.217.935 – triethylenephosphoramide
- MeSH D03.383.097.217.935.960 – thiotepa
- MeSH D03.383.097.500 – mitomycins
- MeSH D03.383.097.500.350 – mitomycin
- MeSH D03.383.097.500.700 – porfiromycin

==== MeSH D03.383.113 – azocines ====
- MeSH D03.383.113.367 – cyclazocine
- MeSH D03.383.113.367.350 – ethylketocyclazocine
- MeSH D03.383.113.767 – oxazocines
- MeSH D03.383.113.767.500 – nefopam

==== MeSH D03.383.129 – azoles ====
- MeSH D03.383.129.308 – imidazoles
- MeSH D03.383.129.308.030 – aminoimidazole carboxamide
- MeSH D03.383.129.308.040 – antazoline
- MeSH D03.383.129.308.080 – biotin
- MeSH D03.383.129.308.090 – bis(4-methyl-1-homopiperazinylthiocarbonyl)disulfide
- MeSH D03.383.129.308.100 – 4-(3-butoxy-4-methoxybenzyl)-2-imidazolidinone
- MeSH D03.383.129.308.108 – carbimazole
- MeSH D03.383.129.308.130 – cimetidine
- MeSH D03.383.129.308.175 – clotrimazole
- MeSH D03.383.129.308.207 – creatinine
- MeSH D03.383.129.308.240 – dacarbazine
- MeSH D03.383.129.308.245 – dexmedetomidine
- MeSH D03.383.129.308.250 – econazole
- MeSH D03.383.129.308.253 – enoximone
- MeSH D03.383.129.308.260 – etimizol
- MeSH D03.383.129.308.265 – etomidate
- MeSH D03.383.129.308.270 – fadrozole
- MeSH D03.383.129.308.290 – fluspirilene
- MeSH D03.383.129.308.373 – histamine
- MeSH D03.383.129.308.373.500 – methylhistamines
- MeSH D03.383.129.308.385 – histidinol
- MeSH D03.383.129.308.411 – hydantoins
- MeSH D03.383.129.308.411.105 – allantoin
- MeSH D03.383.129.308.411.287 – dantrolene
- MeSH D03.383.129.308.411.620 – mephenytoin
- MeSH D03.383.129.308.411.730 – phenytoin
- MeSH D03.383.129.308.411.868 – thiohydantoins
- MeSH D03.383.129.308.411.868.650 – phenylthiohydantoin
- MeSH D03.383.129.308.428 – idazoxan
- MeSH D03.383.129.308.432 – imidazolidines
- MeSH D03.383.129.308.432.500 – ethylenethiourea
- MeSH D03.383.129.308.436 – imidazolines
- MeSH D03.383.129.308.436.500 – clonidine
- MeSH D03.383.129.308.436.750 – tolazoline
- MeSH D03.383.129.308.445 – impromidine
- MeSH D03.383.129.308.480 – levamisole
- MeSH D03.383.129.308.507 – losartan
- MeSH D03.383.129.308.521 – medetomidine
- MeSH D03.383.129.308.535 – methimazole
- MeSH D03.383.129.308.550 – miconazole
- MeSH D03.383.129.308.585 – naphazoline
- MeSH D03.383.129.308.626 – niridazole
- MeSH D03.383.129.308.658 – nitroimidazoles
- MeSH D03.383.129.308.658.200 – dimetridazole
- MeSH D03.383.129.308.658.250 – etanidazole
- MeSH D03.383.129.308.658.400 – ipronidazole
- MeSH D03.383.129.308.658.500 – metronidazole
- MeSH D03.383.129.308.658.530 – misonidazole
- MeSH D03.383.129.308.658.580 – nimorazole
- MeSH D03.383.129.308.658.700 – ornidazole
- MeSH D03.383.129.308.658.730 – ronidazole
- MeSH D03.383.129.308.658.900 – tinidazole
- MeSH D03.383.129.308.690 – ondansetron
- MeSH D03.383.129.308.704 – oxymetazoline
- MeSH D03.383.129.308.754 – phentolamine
- MeSH D03.383.129.308.884 – tetramisole
- MeSH D03.383.129.308.935 – trimethaphan
- MeSH D03.383.129.308.960 – urocanic acid
- MeSH D03.383.129.385 – isoxazoles
- MeSH D03.383.129.385.025 – alpha-amino-3-hydroxy-5-methyl-4-isoxazolepropionic acid
- MeSH D03.383.129.385.162 – cycloserine
- MeSH D03.383.129.385.231 – ibotenic acid
- MeSH D03.383.129.385.300 – isocarboxazid
- MeSH D03.383.129.462 – oxazoles
- MeSH D03.383.129.462.050 – aminorex
- MeSH D03.383.129.462.175 – dimethadione
- MeSH D03.383.129.462.285 – fura-2
- MeSH D03.383.129.462.470 – muscimol
- MeSH D03.383.129.462.580 – oxadiazoles
- MeSH D03.383.129.462.580.200 – 5-amino-3-((5-nitro-2-furyl)vinyl)-1,2,4-oxadiazole
- MeSH D03.383.129.462.580.400 – 4-chloro-7-nitrobenzofurazan
- MeSH D03.383.129.462.580.600 – quisqualic acid
- MeSH D03.383.129.462.580.693 – sydnones
- MeSH D03.383.129.462.580.693.450 – molsidomine
- MeSH D03.383.129.462.600 – oxazolidinones
- MeSH D03.383.129.462.600.162 – cycloserine
- MeSH D03.383.129.462.600.500 – furazolidone
- MeSH D03.383.129.462.600.600 – nifuratel
- MeSH D03.383.129.462.620 – oxazolone
- MeSH D03.383.129.462.673 – pemoline
- MeSH D03.383.129.462.883 – trimethadione
- MeSH D03.383.129.539 – pyrazoles
- MeSH D03.383.129.539.100 – betazole
- MeSH D03.383.129.539.120 – 4,5-dihydro-1-(3-(trifluoromethyl)phenyl)-1h-pyrazol-3-amine
- MeSH D03.383.129.539.200 – epirizole
- MeSH D03.383.129.539.487 – indazoles
- MeSH D03.383.129.539.487.130 – benzydamine
- MeSH D03.383.129.539.487.350 – granisetron
- MeSH D03.383.129.539.550 – muzolimine
- MeSH D03.383.129.539.650 – oxypurinol
- MeSH D03.383.129.539.850 – pyrazolones
- MeSH D03.383.129.539.850.077 – aminopyrine
- MeSH D03.383.129.539.850.077.025 – ampyrone
- MeSH D03.383.129.539.850.077.150 – dipyrone (metamizole)
- MeSH D03.383.129.539.850.088 – antipyrine
- MeSH D03.383.129.539.850.777 – phenylbutazone
- MeSH D03.383.129.539.850.777.640 – oxyphenbutazone
- MeSH D03.383.129.539.850.777.670 – prenazone
- MeSH D03.383.129.539.850.777.800 – sulfinpyrazone
- MeSH D03.383.129.578 – pyrroles
- MeSH D03.383.129.578.150 – cromakalim
- MeSH D03.383.129.578.399 – maleimides
- MeSH D03.383.129.578.399.418 – ethylmaleimide
- MeSH D03.383.129.578.617 – porphobilinogen
- MeSH D03.383.129.578.748 – prodigiosin
- MeSH D03.383.129.578.770 – pyrrolnitrin
- MeSH D03.383.129.578.840 – tetrapyrroles
- MeSH D03.383.129.578.840.249 – bile pigments
- MeSH D03.383.129.578.840.249.184 – bilirubin
- MeSH D03.383.129.578.840.249.184.200 – biliverdine
- MeSH D03.383.129.578.840.249.727 – urobilin
- MeSH D03.383.129.578.840.249.852 – urobilinogen
- MeSH D03.383.129.578.840.374 – chlorophyll
- MeSH D03.383.129.578.840.374.100 – bacteriochlorophylls
- MeSH D03.383.129.578.840.374.180 – chlorophyllides
- MeSH D03.383.129.578.840.374.700 – pheophytins
- MeSH D03.383.129.578.840.374.725 – protochlorophyllide
- MeSH D03.383.129.578.840.437 – corrinoids
- MeSH D03.383.129.578.840.437.777 – vitamin b 12
- MeSH D03.383.129.578.840.437.777.270 – cobamides
- MeSH D03.383.129.578.840.437.777.560 – hydroxocobalamin
- MeSH D03.383.129.578.840.500 – porphyrins
- MeSH D03.383.129.578.840.500.250 – coproporphyrins
- MeSH D03.383.129.578.840.500.280 – deuteroporphyrins
- MeSH D03.383.129.578.840.500.340 – etioporphyrins
- MeSH D03.383.129.578.840.500.462 – hematoporphyrins
- MeSH D03.383.129.578.840.500.462.400 – hematoporphyrin derivative
- MeSH D03.383.129.578.840.500.462.400.200 – dihematoporphyrin ether
- MeSH D03.383.129.578.840.500.620 – mesoporphyrins
- MeSH D03.383.129.578.840.500.640 – metalloporphyrins
- MeSH D03.383.129.578.840.500.640.220 – chlorophyll
- MeSH D03.383.129.578.840.500.640.220.100 – bacteriochlorophylls
- MeSH D03.383.129.578.840.500.640.220.180 – chlorophyllides
- MeSH D03.383.129.578.840.500.640.220.725 – protochlorophyllide
- MeSH D03.383.129.578.840.500.640.587 – heme
- MeSH D03.383.129.578.840.500.640.587.462 – hemin
- MeSH D03.383.129.578.840.500.700 – porphyrinogens
- MeSH D03.383.129.578.840.500.700.250 – coproporphyrinogens
- MeSH D03.383.129.578.840.500.700.900 – uroporphyrinogens
- MeSH D03.383.129.578.840.500.725 – protoporphyrins
- MeSH D03.383.129.578.840.500.880 – uroporphyrins
- MeSH D03.383.129.578.910 – tolmetin
- MeSH D03.383.129.617 – tetrazoles
- MeSH D03.383.129.617.235 – cefotetan
- MeSH D03.383.129.617.467 – losartan
- MeSH D03.383.129.617.700 – tetrazolium salts
- MeSH D03.383.129.617.700.500 – nitroblue tetrazolium
- MeSH D03.383.129.708 – thiazoles
- MeSH D03.383.129.708.089 – benzothiazoles
- MeSH D03.383.129.708.089.222 – dithiazanine
- MeSH D03.383.129.708.089.416 – ethoxzolamide
- MeSH D03.383.129.708.089.611 – riluzole
- MeSH D03.383.129.708.089.708 – saccharin
- MeSH D03.383.129.708.089.805 – thiabendazole
- MeSH D03.383.129.708.180 – chlormethiazole
- MeSH D03.383.129.708.215 – famotidine
- MeSH D03.383.129.708.250 – fanft
- MeSH D03.383.129.708.298 – firefly luciferin
- MeSH D03.383.129.708.346 – levamisole
- MeSH D03.383.129.708.482 – niridazole
- MeSH D03.383.129.708.500 – nizatidine
- MeSH D03.383.129.708.540 – oxythiamine
- MeSH D03.383.129.708.649 – rhodanine
- MeSH D03.383.129.708.653 – ritonavir
- MeSH D03.383.129.708.725 – sulfathiazoles
- MeSH D03.383.129.708.782 – tetramisole
- MeSH D03.383.129.708.867 – thiadiazoles
- MeSH D03.383.129.708.867.060 – acetazolamide
- MeSH D03.383.129.708.867.120 – benzolamide
- MeSH D03.383.129.708.867.537 – methazolamide
- MeSH D03.383.129.708.867.768 – timolol
- MeSH D03.383.129.708.900 – thiamine
- MeSH D03.383.129.708.900.300 – fursultiamin
- MeSH D03.383.129.708.900.600 – thiamine monophosphate
- MeSH D03.383.129.708.900.702 – thiamine pyrophosphate
- MeSH D03.383.129.708.900.900 – thiamine triphosphate
- MeSH D03.383.129.708.933 – thiazolidinediones
- MeSH D03.383.129.799 – triazoles
- MeSH D03.383.129.799.100 – amitrole
- MeSH D03.383.129.799.450 – fluconazole
- MeSH D03.383.129.799.500 – guanazole
- MeSH D03.383.129.799.550 – itraconazole
- MeSH D03.383.129.799.900 – trapidil

==== MeSH D03.383.231 – dioxins ====
- MeSH D03.383.231.388 – dioxanes
- MeSH D03.383.231.388.425 – idazoxan
- MeSH D03.383.231.900 – tetrachlorodibenzodioxin

==== MeSH D03.383.246 – dioxoles ====
- MeSH D03.383.246.118 – benzodioxoles
- MeSH D03.383.246.118.600 – piperonyl butoxide
- MeSH D03.383.246.118.750 – safrole
- MeSH D03.383.246.238 – dioxolanes

==== MeSH D03.383.312 – furans ====
- MeSH D03.383.312.150 – 4-butyrolactone
- MeSH D03.383.312.250 – citraconic anhydrides
- MeSH D03.383.312.355 – furaldehyde
- MeSH D03.383.312.490 – lasalocid
- MeSH D03.383.312.520 – maleic anhydrides
- MeSH D03.383.312.600 – monensin
- MeSH D03.383.312.620 – nafronyl
- MeSH D03.383.312.634 – nigericin
- MeSH D03.383.312.649 – nitrofurans
- MeSH D03.383.312.649.200 – 5-amino-3-((5-nitro-2-furyl)vinyl)-1,2,4-oxadiazole
- MeSH D03.383.312.649.290 – fanft
- MeSH D03.383.312.649.308 – furagin
- MeSH D03.383.312.649.313 – furazolidone
- MeSH D03.383.312.649.330 – furylfuramide
- MeSH D03.383.312.649.410 – nifuratel
- MeSH D03.383.312.649.480 – nifurtimox
- MeSH D03.383.312.649.566 – nitrofurantoin
- MeSH D03.383.312.649.691 – nitrofurazone
- MeSH D03.383.312.649.750 – nitrovin
- MeSH D03.383.312.699 – psoralens
- MeSH D03.383.312.699.200 – ficusin
- MeSH D03.383.312.699.300 – khellin
- MeSH D03.383.312.699.500 – methoxsalen
- MeSH D03.383.312.699.875 – trioxsalen
- MeSH D03.383.312.750 – ranitidine

==== MeSH D03.383.411 – lactams ====
- MeSH D03.383.411.200 – caprolactam
- MeSH D03.383.411.350 – monobactams
- MeSH D03.383.411.350.044 – aztreonam
- MeSH D03.383.411.500 – moxalactam

==== MeSH D03.383.517 – oxathiins ====
- MeSH D03.383.517.200 – carboxin

==== MeSH D03.383.533 – oxazines ====
- MeSH D03.383.533.249 – benzoxazines
- MeSH D03.383.533.500 – ifosfamide
- MeSH D03.383.533.640 – morpholines
- MeSH D03.383.533.640.250 – dextromoramide
- MeSH D03.383.533.640.362 – molsidomine
- MeSH D03.383.533.640.475 – moricizine
- MeSH D03.383.533.640.650 – phenmetrazine
- MeSH D03.383.533.640.775 – timolol
- MeSH D03.383.533.640.900 – viloxazine
- MeSH D03.383.533.640.950 – xamoterol

==== MeSH D03.383.606 – piperazines ====
- MeSH D03.383.606.130 – almitrine
- MeSH D03.383.606.290 – cinnarizine
- MeSH D03.383.606.320 – cyclizine
- MeSH D03.383.606.350 – delavirdine
- MeSH D03.383.606.380 – diethylcarbamazine
- MeSH D03.383.606.390 – dimethylphenylpiperazinium iodide
- MeSH D03.383.606.450 – flunarizine
- MeSH D03.383.606.460 – flupenthixol
- MeSH D03.383.606.500 – hepes
- MeSH D03.383.606.515 – hydroxyzine
- MeSH D03.383.606.515.200 – cetirizine
- MeSH D03.383.606.527 – 1-(5-isoquinolinesulfonyl)-2-methylpiperazine
- MeSH D03.383.606.530 – itraconazole
- MeSH D03.383.606.560 – ketoconazole
- MeSH D03.383.606.596 – lidoflazine
- MeSH D03.383.606.650 – meclizine
- MeSH D03.383.606.760 – pipecuronium
- MeSH D03.383.606.765 – pipemidic acid
- MeSH D03.383.606.773 – pipobroman
- MeSH D03.383.606.790 – piribedil
- MeSH D03.383.606.810 – prospidium
- MeSH D03.383.606.827 – quipazine
- MeSH D03.383.606.845 – razoxane
- MeSH D03.383.606.880 – thiethylperazine
- MeSH D03.383.606.900 – trazodone
- MeSH D03.383.606.920 – trimetazidine

==== MeSH D03.383.621 – piperidines ====
- MeSH D03.383.621.040 – alphaprodine
- MeSH D03.383.621.050 – anabasine
- MeSH D03.383.621.080 – betalains
- MeSH D03.383.621.080.500 – betacyanins
- MeSH D03.383.621.080.750 – betaxanthins
- MeSH D03.383.621.110 – biperiden
- MeSH D03.383.621.135 – cisapride
- MeSH D03.383.621.147 – clopamide
- MeSH D03.383.621.160 – cyproheptadine
- MeSH D03.383.621.160.500 – loratadine
- MeSH D03.383.621.180 – 1-deoxynojirimycin
- MeSH D03.383.621.210 – domperidone
- MeSH D03.383.621.265 – fentanyl
- MeSH D03.383.621.265.100 – alfentanil
- MeSH D03.383.621.265.900 – sufentanil
- MeSH D03.383.621.270 – flecainide
- MeSH D03.383.621.280 – fluspirilene
- MeSH D03.383.621.300 – imino pyranoses
- MeSH D03.383.621.320 – indoramin
- MeSH D03.383.621.349 – isonipecotic acids
- MeSH D03.383.621.349.300 – diphenoxylate
- MeSH D03.383.621.349.450 – meperidine
- MeSH D03.383.621.349.450.700 – promedol
- MeSH D03.383.621.349.683 – phenoperidine
- MeSH D03.383.621.349.700 – pirinitramide
- MeSH D03.383.621.365 – ketanserin
- MeSH D03.383.621.370 – ketotifen
- MeSH D03.383.621.418 – lobeline
- MeSH D03.383.621.440 – loperamide
- MeSH D03.383.621.450 – mepivacaine
- MeSH D03.383.621.460 – methylphenidate
- MeSH D03.383.621.493 – minoxidil
- MeSH D03.383.621.566 – nipecotic acids
- MeSH D03.383.621.600 – paroxetine
- MeSH D03.383.621.610 – pempidine
- MeSH D03.383.621.620 – penfluridol
- MeSH D03.383.621.644 – perhexiline
- MeSH D03.383.621.699 – phencyclidine
- MeSH D03.383.621.758 – pipecolic acids
- MeSH D03.383.621.758.323 – bupivacaine
- MeSH D03.383.621.808 – piperidones
- MeSH D03.383.621.808.240 – cycloheximide
- MeSH D03.383.621.808.250 – dexetimide
- MeSH D03.383.621.808.425 – glutethimide
- MeSH D03.383.621.808.425.100 – aminoglutethimide
- MeSH D03.383.621.808.800 – thalidomide
- MeSH D03.383.621.808.930 – triacetoneamine-n-oxyl
- MeSH D03.383.621.815 – piperoxan
- MeSH D03.383.621.840 – ritanserin
- MeSH D03.383.621.855 – terfenadine
- MeSH D03.383.621.900 – trihexyphenidyl

==== MeSH D03.383.663 – pyrans ====
- MeSH D03.383.663.075 – aurovertins
- MeSH D03.383.663.491 – iridoids
- MeSH D03.383.663.620 – nigericin
- MeSH D03.383.663.705 – pyran copolymer
- MeSH D03.383.663.718 – pyrones

==== MeSH D03.383.679 – pyrazines ====
- MeSH D03.383.679.149 – amiloride
- MeSH D03.383.679.750 – pyrazinamide

==== MeSH D03.383.710 – pyridazines ====
- MeSH D03.383.710.100 – cilazapril
- MeSH D03.383.710.350 – luminol
- MeSH D03.383.710.400 – maleic hydrazide
- MeSH D03.383.710.605 – phthalazines
- MeSH D03.383.710.605.500 – hydralazine
- MeSH D03.383.710.605.500.250 – dihydralazine
- MeSH D03.383.710.605.925 – todralazine

==== MeSH D03.383.725 – pyridines ====
- MeSH D03.383.725.050 – aminopyridines
- MeSH D03.383.725.050.060 – 4-aminopyridine
- MeSH D03.383.725.050.085 – amrinone
- MeSH D03.383.725.050.085.543 – milrinone
- MeSH D03.383.725.050.440 – methapyrilene
- MeSH D03.383.725.050.610 – phenazopyridine
- MeSH D03.383.725.050.805 – pyrilamine
- MeSH D03.383.725.050.920 – tripelennamine
- MeSH D03.383.725.086 – betahistine
- MeSH D03.383.725.150 – carbolines
- MeSH D03.383.725.180 – clopidol
- MeSH D03.383.725.203 – dihydropyridines
- MeSH D03.383.725.203.065 – amlodipine
- MeSH D03.383.725.203.200 – dicarbethoxydihydrocollidine
- MeSH D03.383.725.203.250 – felodipine
- MeSH D03.383.725.203.310 – isradipine
- MeSH D03.383.725.203.510 – nicardipine
- MeSH D03.383.725.203.540 – nifedipine
- MeSH D03.383.725.203.570 – nimodipine
- MeSH D03.383.725.203.580 – nisoldipine
- MeSH D03.383.725.203.590 – nitrendipine
- MeSH D03.383.725.203.600 – 3-pyridinecarboxylic acid, 1,4-dihydro-2,6-dimethyl-5-nitro-4-(2-(trifluoromethyl)phenyl)-, methyl ester
- MeSH D03.383.725.210 – dimethindene
- MeSH D03.383.725.220 – 2,2'-dipyridyl
- MeSH D03.383.725.227 – disopyramide
- MeSH D03.383.725.259 – doxylamine
- MeSH D03.383.725.385 – indinavir
- MeSH D03.383.725.394 – isonicotinic acids
- MeSH D03.383.725.394.220 – ethionamide
- MeSH D03.383.725.394.414 – iproniazid
- MeSH D03.383.725.394.582 – isoniazid
- MeSH D03.383.725.394.628 – nialamide
- MeSH D03.383.725.394.675 – prothionamide
- MeSH D03.383.725.394.700 – pyridoxic acid
- MeSH D03.383.725.450 – 1-methyl-4-phenyl-1,2,3,6-tetrahydropyridine
- MeSH D03.383.725.463 – metyrapone
- MeSH D03.383.725.495 – naphthylvinylpyridine
- MeSH D03.383.725.506 – nevirapine
- MeSH D03.383.725.518 – nicotine
- MeSH D03.383.725.547 – nicotinic acids
- MeSH D03.383.725.547.292 – arecoline
- MeSH D03.383.725.547.375 – clonixin
- MeSH D03.383.725.547.400 – etazolate
- MeSH D03.383.725.547.475 – niacin
- MeSH D03.383.725.547.530 – niacinamide
- MeSH D03.383.725.547.530.248 – 6-aminonicotinamide
- MeSH D03.383.725.547.530.498 – nicorandil
- MeSH D03.383.725.547.530.500 – nikethamide
- MeSH D03.383.725.547.540 – niceritrol
- MeSH D03.383.725.547.550 – niflumic acid
- MeSH D03.383.725.547.570 – nimodipine
- MeSH D03.383.725.547.635 – pipemidic acid
- MeSH D03.383.725.547.650 – piromidic acid
- MeSH D03.383.725.547.900 – 3-pyridinecarboxylic acid, 1,4-dihydro-2,6-dimethyl-5-nitro-4-(2-(trifluoromethyl)phenyl)-, methyl ester
- MeSH D03.383.725.547.950 – xanthinol niacinate
- MeSH D03.383.725.565 – nicotinyl alcohol
- MeSH D03.383.725.592 – omeprazole
- MeSH D03.383.725.620 – pheniramine
- MeSH D03.383.725.620.129 – brompheniramine
- MeSH D03.383.725.620.129.960 – zimeldine
- MeSH D03.383.725.620.150 – chlorpheniramine
- MeSH D03.383.725.676 – picolines
- MeSH D03.383.725.676.152 – amprolium
- MeSH D03.383.725.676.925 – vitamin b 6
- MeSH D03.383.725.676.925.500 – pyridoxal
- MeSH D03.383.725.676.925.500.500 – pyridoxal phosphate
- MeSH D03.383.725.676.925.750 – pyridoxamine
- MeSH D03.383.725.676.925.875 – pyridoxine
- MeSH D03.383.725.705 – picolinic acids
- MeSH D03.383.725.705.200 – fusaric acid
- MeSH D03.383.725.705.523 – picloram
- MeSH D03.383.725.705.645 – pyridoxic acid
- MeSH D03.383.725.705.768 – streptonigrin
- MeSH D03.383.725.740 – polyvinylpyridine n-oxide
- MeSH D03.383.725.762 – pyridinium compounds
- MeSH D03.383.725.762.232 – cetylpyridinium
- MeSH D03.383.725.762.300 – desmosine
- MeSH D03.383.725.762.352 – diquat
- MeSH D03.383.725.762.500 – isodesmosine
- MeSH D03.383.725.762.550 – 1-methyl-4-phenylpyridinium
- MeSH D03.383.725.762.600 – obidoxime chloride
- MeSH D03.383.725.762.621 – paraquat
- MeSH D03.383.725.762.740 – pyridostigmine bromide
- MeSH D03.383.725.762.760 – pyrithiamine
- MeSH D03.383.725.762.900 – trimedoxime
- MeSH D03.383.725.762.925 – viologens
- MeSH D03.383.725.762.925.100 – benzyl viologen
- MeSH D03.383.725.791 – pyridones
- MeSH D03.383.725.791.100 – bemegride
- MeSH D03.383.725.791.496 – iodopyridones
- MeSH D03.383.725.791.496.371 – iodopyracet
- MeSH D03.383.725.791.496.750 – propyliodone
- MeSH D03.383.725.791.550 – mimosine
- MeSH D03.383.725.791.900 – trazodone
- MeSH D03.383.725.812 – pyrithioxin
- MeSH D03.383.725.822 – quinolinic acids
- MeSH D03.383.725.822.700 – quinolinic acid
- MeSH D03.383.725.877 – tolperisone
- MeSH D03.383.725.932 – triprolidine
- MeSH D03.383.725.942 – tropicamide

==== MeSH D03.383.742 – pyrimidines ====
- MeSH D03.383.742.120 – buspirone
- MeSH D03.383.742.175 – dipyridamole
- MeSH D03.383.742.200 – epirizole
- MeSH D03.383.742.225 – fursultiamin
- MeSH D03.383.742.279 – hexetidine
- MeSH D03.383.742.418 – minoxidil
- MeSH D03.383.742.430 – mopidamol
- MeSH D03.383.742.440 – morantel
- MeSH D03.383.742.470 – nicarbazin
- MeSH D03.383.742.550 – oxypurinol
- MeSH D03.383.742.634 – pyrantel
- MeSH D03.383.742.634.600 – pyrantel pamoate
- MeSH D03.383.742.634.670 – pyrantel tartrate
- MeSH D03.383.742.675 – pyrimethamine
- MeSH D03.383.742.698 – pyrimidinones
- MeSH D03.383.742.698.122 – alloxan
- MeSH D03.383.742.698.253 – barbiturates
- MeSH D03.383.742.698.253.077 – amobarbital
- MeSH D03.383.742.698.253.150 – barbital
- MeSH D03.383.742.698.253.317 – hexobarbital
- MeSH D03.383.742.698.253.434 – mephobarbital
- MeSH D03.383.742.698.253.488 – methohexital
- MeSH D03.383.742.698.253.500 – murexide
- MeSH D03.383.742.698.253.593 – pentobarbital
- MeSH D03.383.742.698.253.650 – phenobarbital
- MeSH D03.383.742.698.253.650.700 – primidone
- MeSH D03.383.742.698.253.762 – secobarbital
- MeSH D03.383.742.698.253.800 – thiobarbiturates
- MeSH D03.383.742.698.253.800.750 – thiamylal
- MeSH D03.383.742.698.253.800.810 – thiopental
- MeSH D03.383.742.698.421 – cytosine
- MeSH D03.383.742.698.421.431 – flucytosine
- MeSH D03.383.742.698.421.500 – 5-methylcytosine
- MeSH D03.383.742.698.685 – risperidone
- MeSH D03.383.742.698.700 – ritanserin
- MeSH D03.383.742.698.715 – sparsomycin
- MeSH D03.383.742.698.875 – uracil
- MeSH D03.383.742.698.875.237 – bromouracil
- MeSH D03.383.742.698.875.404 – fluorouracil
- MeSH D03.383.742.698.875.404.850 – tegafur
- MeSH D03.383.742.698.875.480 – hydroxyphenylazouracil
- MeSH D03.383.742.698.875.660 – orotic acid
- MeSH D03.383.742.698.875.700 – pentoxyl
- MeSH D03.383.742.698.875.842 – thiouracil
- MeSH D03.383.742.698.875.842.455 – methylthiouracil
- MeSH D03.383.742.698.875.842.708 – propylthiouracil
- MeSH D03.383.742.698.875.899 – thymine
- MeSH D03.383.742.698.875.949 – uracil mustard
- MeSH D03.383.742.715 – pyrithiamine
- MeSH D03.383.742.795 – thiamine
- MeSH D03.383.742.795.300 – fursultiamin
- MeSH D03.383.742.795.600 – thiamine monophosphate
- MeSH D03.383.742.795.702 – thiamine pyrophosphate
- MeSH D03.383.742.795.900 – thiamine triphosphate
- MeSH D03.383.742.875 – trapidil
- MeSH D03.383.742.906 – trimethoprim
- MeSH D03.383.742.906.500 – trimethoprim-sulfamethoxazole combination

==== MeSH D03.383.773 – pyrrolidines ====
- MeSH D03.383.773.050 – anisomycin
- MeSH D03.383.773.107 – bepridil
- MeSH D03.383.773.165 – clemastine
- MeSH D03.383.773.170 – 3,4-dichloro-n-methyl-n-(2-(1-pyrrolidinyl)-cyclohexyl)-benzeneacetamide, (trans)-isomer
- MeSH D03.383.773.342 – glycopyrrolate
- MeSH D03.383.773.371 – imino furanoses
- MeSH D03.383.773.400 – kainic acid
- MeSH D03.383.773.475 – lincomycin
- MeSH D03.383.773.475.125 – clindamycin
- MeSH D03.383.773.589 – nafoxidine
- MeSH D03.383.773.610 – nitromifene
- MeSH D03.383.773.630 – n-nitrosopyrrolidine
- MeSH D03.383.773.700 – pentolinium tartrate
- MeSH D03.383.773.728 – procyclidine
- MeSH D03.383.773.812 – pyrrolidinones
- MeSH D03.383.773.812.180 – cotinine
- MeSH D03.383.773.812.226 – doxapram
- MeSH D03.383.773.812.498 – oxotremorine
- MeSH D03.383.773.812.555 – piracetam
- MeSH D03.383.773.812.615 – povidone
- MeSH D03.383.773.812.615.630 – povidone-iodine
- MeSH D03.383.773.812.718 – pyrrolidonecarboxylic acid
- MeSH D03.383.773.812.785 – rolipram
- MeSH D03.383.773.812.852 – succinimides
- MeSH D03.383.773.812.852.150 – bromosuccinimide
- MeSH D03.383.773.812.852.333 – ethosuximide
- MeSH D03.383.773.812.900 – tenuazonic acid
- MeSH D03.383.773.906 – tremorine

==== MeSH D03.383.855 – thiazines ====
- MeSH D03.383.855.150 – chlormezanone
- MeSH D03.383.855.400 – nifurtimox
- MeSH D03.383.855.500 – piroxicam
- MeSH D03.383.855.785 – thiadiazines
- MeSH D03.383.855.985 – xylazine

==== MeSH D03.383.886 – thiepins ====
- MeSH D03.383.886.702 – thiazepines

==== MeSH D03.383.903 – thiophenes ====
- MeSH D03.383.903.150 – carticaine
- MeSH D03.383.903.370 – ketotifen
- MeSH D03.383.903.440 – morantel
- MeSH D03.383.903.580 – pizotyline
- MeSH D03.383.903.634 – pyrantel
- MeSH D03.383.903.634.600 – pyrantel pamoate
- MeSH D03.383.903.634.670 – pyrantel tartrate
- MeSH D03.383.903.820 – thenoyltrifluoroacetone
- MeSH D03.383.903.834 – ticlopidine
- MeSH D03.383.903.840 – ticrynafen
- MeSH D03.383.903.850 – tiletamine

==== MeSH D03.383.931 – triazines ====
- MeSH D03.383.931.095 – almitrine
- MeSH D03.383.931.135 – altretamine
- MeSH D03.383.931.190 – apazone
- MeSH D03.383.931.247 – atrazine
- MeSH D03.383.931.320 – ferrozine
- MeSH D03.383.931.640 – oxonic acid
- MeSH D03.383.931.674 – prometryne
- MeSH D03.383.931.819 – simazine
- MeSH D03.383.931.915 – triethylenemelamine

=== MeSH D03.438 – heterocyclic compounds, 2-ring ===
==== MeSH D03.438.079 – benzazepines ====
- MeSH D03.438.079.080 – benzodiazepines
- MeSH D03.438.079.080.030 – alprazolam
- MeSH D03.438.079.080.070 – benzodiazepinones
- MeSH D03.438.079.080.070.050 – anthramycin
- MeSH D03.438.079.080.070.110 – bromazepam
- MeSH D03.438.079.080.070.150 – clonazepam
- MeSH D03.438.079.080.070.200 – devazepide
- MeSH D03.438.079.080.070.216 – diazepam
- MeSH D03.438.079.080.070.216.500 – nordazepam
- MeSH D03.438.079.080.070.305 – flumazenil
- MeSH D03.438.079.080.070.320 – flunitrazepam
- MeSH D03.438.079.080.070.348 – flurazepam
- MeSH D03.438.079.080.070.450 – lorazepam
- MeSH D03.438.079.080.070.565 – nitrazepam
- MeSH D03.438.079.080.070.663 – oxazepam
- MeSH D03.438.079.080.070.750 – pirenzepine
- MeSH D03.438.079.080.070.784 – prazepam
- MeSH D03.438.079.080.070.880 – temazepam
- MeSH D03.438.079.080.150 – chlordiazepoxide
- MeSH D03.438.079.080.180 – clorazepate dipotassium
- MeSH D03.438.079.080.250 – estazolam
- MeSH D03.438.079.080.550 – medazepam
- MeSH D03.438.079.080.575 – midazolam
- MeSH D03.438.079.080.900 – triazolam
- MeSH D03.438.079.150 – diltiazem
- MeSH D03.438.079.300 – fenoldopam
- MeSH D03.438.079.525 – galantamine
- MeSH D03.438.079.533 – harringtonines
- MeSH D03.438.079.750 – (r)-2,3,4,5-tetrahydro-8-chloro-3-methyl-5-phenyl-1h-3-benzazepin-7-ol
- MeSH D03.438.079.800 – 2,3,4,5-tetrahydro-7,8-dihydroxy-1-phenyl-1h-3-benzazepine

==== MeSH D03.438.103 – benzimidazoles ====
- MeSH D03.438.103.070 – albendazole
- MeSH D03.438.103.105 – astemizole
- MeSH D03.438.103.140 – benomyl
- MeSH D03.438.103.145 – bisbenzimide
- MeSH D03.438.103.190 – cambendazole
- MeSH D03.438.103.370 – domperidone
- MeSH D03.438.103.393 – droperidol
- MeSH D03.438.103.450 – fenbendazole
- MeSH D03.438.103.600 – mebendazole
- MeSH D03.438.103.618 – mibefradil
- MeSH D03.438.103.637 – nocodazole
- MeSH D03.438.103.675 – omeprazole
- MeSH D03.438.103.732 – pimozide
- MeSH D03.438.103.850 – thiabendazole

==== MeSH D03.438.115 – benzodioxoles ====
- MeSH D03.438.115.600 – piperonyl butoxide
- MeSH D03.438.115.750 – safrole

==== MeSH D03.438.127 – benzofurans ====
- MeSH D03.438.127.075 – amiodarone
- MeSH D03.438.127.110 – benzbromarone
- MeSH D03.438.127.125 – cantharidin
- MeSH D03.438.127.187 – citalopram
- MeSH D03.438.127.250 – fura-2
- MeSH D03.438.127.275 – griseofulvin
- MeSH D03.438.127.637 – pterocarpans

==== MeSH D03.438.150 – benzopyrans ====
- MeSH D03.438.150.119 – aflatoxins
- MeSH D03.438.150.119.075 – aflatoxin b1
- MeSH D03.438.150.119.100 – aflatoxin m1
- MeSH D03.438.150.240 – chromans
- MeSH D03.438.150.240.190 – catechin
- MeSH D03.438.150.240.225 – centchroman
- MeSH D03.438.150.266 – chromones
- MeSH D03.438.150.266.300 – cromolyn sodium
- MeSH D03.438.150.266.450 – flavonoids
- MeSH D03.438.150.266.450.087 – anthocyanins
- MeSH D03.438.150.266.450.175 – benzoflavones
- MeSH D03.438.150.266.450.175.100 – beta-naphthoflavone
- MeSH D03.438.150.266.450.190 – biflavonoids
- MeSH D03.438.150.266.450.206 – catechin
- MeSH D03.438.150.266.450.221 – chalcones
- MeSH D03.438.150.266.450.221.500 – chalcone
- MeSH D03.438.150.266.450.252 – flavanones
- MeSH D03.438.150.266.450.252.500 – hesperidin
- MeSH D03.438.150.266.450.260 – flavones
- MeSH D03.438.150.266.450.260.110 – apigenin
- MeSH D03.438.150.266.450.260.222 – diosmin
- MeSH D03.438.150.266.450.260.444 – flavoxate
- MeSH D03.438.150.266.450.260.555 – luteolin
- MeSH D03.438.150.266.450.268 – flavonolignans
- MeSH D03.438.150.266.450.268.777 – silymarin
- MeSH D03.438.150.266.450.284 – flavonols
- MeSH D03.438.150.266.450.284.388 – kaempferols
- MeSH D03.438.150.266.450.284.777 – quercetin
- MeSH D03.438.150.266.450.284.888 – rutin
- MeSH D03.438.150.266.450.284.888.500 – hydroxyethylrutoside
- MeSH D03.438.150.266.450.400 – isoflavones
- MeSH D03.438.150.266.450.400.187 – coumestrol
- MeSH D03.438.150.266.450.400.375 – genistein
- MeSH D03.438.150.266.450.400.687 – pterocarpans
- MeSH D03.438.150.266.450.400.843 – rotenone
- MeSH D03.438.150.266.450.700 – proanthocyanidins
- MeSH D03.438.150.320 – citrinin
- MeSH D03.438.150.446 – coumarins
- MeSH D03.438.150.446.139 – aminocoumarins
- MeSH D03.438.150.446.139.500 – novobiocin
- MeSH D03.438.150.446.280 – chromonar
- MeSH D03.438.150.446.350 – coumestrol
- MeSH D03.438.150.446.400 – esculin
- MeSH D03.438.150.446.520 – 4-hydroxycoumarins
- MeSH D03.438.150.446.520.079 – acenocoumarol
- MeSH D03.438.150.446.520.203 – dicumarol
- MeSH D03.438.150.446.520.451 – ethyl biscoumacetate
- MeSH D03.438.150.446.520.750 – phenprocoumon
- MeSH D03.438.150.446.520.914 – warfarin
- MeSH D03.438.150.446.598 – isocoumarins
- MeSH D03.438.150.446.677 – ochratoxins
- MeSH D03.438.150.446.794 – psoralens
- MeSH D03.438.150.446.794.200 – ficusin
- MeSH D03.438.150.446.794.300 – khellin
- MeSH D03.438.150.446.794.500 – methoxsalen
- MeSH D03.438.150.446.794.875 – trioxsalen
- MeSH D03.438.150.446.853 – pyranocoumarins
- MeSH D03.438.150.446.912 – umbelliferones
- MeSH D03.438.150.446.912.326 – coumaphos
- MeSH D03.438.150.446.912.531 – hymecromone
- MeSH D03.438.150.446.912.850 – scopoletin
- MeSH D03.438.150.455 – cromakalim
- MeSH D03.438.150.500 – ellagic acid
- MeSH D03.438.150.600 – hematoxylin
- MeSH D03.438.150.909 – vitamin e
- MeSH D03.438.150.909.750 – tocopherols
- MeSH D03.438.150.909.750.249 – alpha-tocopherol
- MeSH D03.438.150.909.750.374 – beta-tocopherol
- MeSH D03.438.150.909.750.500 – gamma-tocopherol
- MeSH D03.438.150.909.875 – tocotrienols

==== MeSH D03.438.174 – benzothiadiazines ====
- MeSH D03.438.174.138 – bendroflumethiazide
- MeSH D03.438.174.261 – chlorothiazide
- MeSH D03.438.174.261.476 – hydrochlorothiazide
- MeSH D03.438.174.261.476.716 – trichlormethiazide
- MeSH D03.438.174.285 – cyclopenthiazide
- MeSH D03.438.174.300 – diazoxide
- MeSH D03.438.174.475 – hydroflumethiazide
- MeSH D03.438.174.620 – methyclothiazide
- MeSH D03.438.174.781 – polythiazide

==== MeSH D03.438.185 – benzothiazoles ====
- MeSH D03.438.185.222 – dithiazanine
- MeSH D03.438.185.416 – ethoxzolamide
- MeSH D03.438.185.611 – riluzole
- MeSH D03.438.185.708 – saccharin
- MeSH D03.438.185.805 – thiabendazole

==== MeSH D03.438.197 – benzothiepins ====
- MeSH D03.438.197.408 – endosulfan

==== MeSH D03.438.221 – benzoxazoles ====
- MeSH D03.438.221.173 – calcimycin
- MeSH D03.438.221.346 – chlorzoxazone
- MeSH D03.438.221.370 – cialit
- MeSH D03.438.221.950 – zoxazolamine

==== MeSH D03.438.260 – bicyclo compounds, heterocyclic ====
- MeSH D03.438.260.825 – penicillins
- MeSH D03.438.260.825.124 – amdinocillin
- MeSH D03.438.260.825.124.036 – amdinocillin pivoxil
- MeSH D03.438.260.825.249 – cyclacillin
- MeSH D03.438.260.825.500 – methicillin
- MeSH D03.438.260.825.562 – nafcillin
- MeSH D03.438.260.825.625 – oxacillin
- MeSH D03.438.260.825.625.150 – cloxacillin
- MeSH D03.438.260.825.625.150.205 – dicloxacillin
- MeSH D03.438.260.825.625.150.250 – floxacillin
- MeSH D03.438.260.825.687 – penicillanic acid
- MeSH D03.438.260.825.750 – penicillin g
- MeSH D03.438.260.825.750.050 – ampicillin
- MeSH D03.438.260.825.750.050.050 – amoxicillin
- MeSH D03.438.260.825.750.050.050.060 – amoxicillin-potassium clavulanate combination
- MeSH D03.438.260.825.750.050.075 – azlocillin
- MeSH D03.438.260.825.750.050.500 – mezlocillin
- MeSH D03.438.260.825.750.050.650 – piperacillin
- MeSH D03.438.260.825.750.050.700 – pivampicillin
- MeSH D03.438.260.825.750.050.900 – talampicillin
- MeSH D03.438.260.825.750.170 – carbenicillin
- MeSH D03.438.260.825.750.170.200 – carfecillin
- MeSH D03.438.260.825.750.685 – penicillin g, benzathine
- MeSH D03.438.260.825.750.695 – penicillin g, procaine
- MeSH D03.438.260.825.750.875 – sulbenicillin
- MeSH D03.438.260.825.781 – penicillin v
- MeSH D03.438.260.825.812 – sulbactam
- MeSH D03.438.260.825.875 – ticarcillin

==== MeSH D03.438.449 – indazoles ====
- MeSH D03.438.449.130 – benzydamine
- MeSH D03.438.449.350 – granisetron

==== MeSH D03.438.473 – indoles ====
- MeSH D03.438.473.025 – adrenochrome
- MeSH D03.438.473.050 – alcian blue
- MeSH D03.438.473.133 – captan
- MeSH D03.438.473.155 – carbolines
- MeSH D03.438.473.193 – chlorisondamine
- MeSH D03.438.473.231 – cytochalasins
- MeSH D03.438.473.231.370 – cytochalasin b
- MeSH D03.438.473.231.450 – cytochalasin d
- MeSH D03.438.473.250 – delavirdine
- MeSH D03.438.473.360 – gliotoxin
- MeSH D03.438.473.385 – hydroxytryptophol
- MeSH D03.438.473.390 – ibogaine
- MeSH D03.438.473.391 – indapamide
- MeSH D03.438.473.393 – indican
- MeSH D03.438.473.396 – indigotindisulfonate sodium
- MeSH D03.438.473.400 – indocyanine green
- MeSH D03.438.473.402 – indole alkaloids
- MeSH D03.438.473.402.255 – curare
- MeSH D03.438.473.402.255.712 – toxiferine
- MeSH D03.438.473.402.255.712.050 – alcuronium
- MeSH D03.438.473.402.255.847 – tubocurarine
- MeSH D03.438.473.402.444 – harmaline
- MeSH D03.438.473.402.477 – harmine
- MeSH D03.438.473.402.511 – lyngbya toxins
- MeSH D03.438.473.402.545 – physostigmine
- MeSH D03.438.473.402.613 – psilocybine
- MeSH D03.438.473.402.681 – secologanin tryptamine alkaloids
- MeSH D03.438.473.402.681.077 – ajmaline
- MeSH D03.438.473.402.681.077.650 – prajmaline
- MeSH D03.438.473.402.681.333 – ellipticines
- MeSH D03.438.473.402.681.444 – ibogaine
- MeSH D03.438.473.402.681.722 – strychnine
- MeSH D03.438.473.402.681.827 – vinca alkaloids
- MeSH D03.438.473.402.681.827.650 – vinblastine
- MeSH D03.438.473.402.681.827.750 – vincamine
- MeSH D03.438.473.402.681.827.817 – vincristine
- MeSH D03.438.473.402.681.827.830 – vindesine
- MeSH D03.438.473.402.681.933 – yohimbine
- MeSH D03.438.473.402.681.933.500 – reserpine
- MeSH D03.438.473.402.750 – staurosporine
- MeSH D03.438.473.404 – indoleacetic acids
- MeSH D03.438.473.404.200 – etodolac
- MeSH D03.438.473.404.478 – hydroxyindoleacetic acid
- MeSH D03.438.473.412 – indolequinones
- MeSH D03.438.473.412.249 – mitomycins
- MeSH D03.438.473.412.249.350 – mitomycin
- MeSH D03.438.473.412.249.700 – porfiromycin
- MeSH D03.438.473.412.500 – pyrroloiminoquinones
- MeSH D03.438.473.420 – indomethacin
- MeSH D03.438.473.420.485 – ketorolac
- MeSH D03.438.473.420.742 – ketorolac tromethamine
- MeSH D03.438.473.432 – indoramin
- MeSH D03.438.473.469 – iprindole
- MeSH D03.438.473.525 – isatin
- MeSH D03.438.473.600 – mazindol
- MeSH D03.438.473.615 – methisazone
- MeSH D03.438.473.629 – molindone
- MeSH D03.438.473.725 – oxyphenisatin acetate
- MeSH D03.438.473.766 – perindopril
- MeSH D03.438.473.808 – skatole
- MeSH D03.438.473.840 – sporidesmins
- MeSH D03.438.473.914 – tryptamines
- MeSH D03.438.473.914.201 – dihydroxytryptamines
- MeSH D03.438.473.914.201.259 – 5,6-dihydroxytryptamine
- MeSH D03.438.473.914.201.263 – 5,7-dihydroxytryptamine
- MeSH D03.438.473.914.237 – N,N-dimethyltryptamine
- MeSH D03.438.473.914.237.150 – bufotenin
- MeSH D03.438.473.914.237.150.500 – methoxydimethyltryptamines
- MeSH D03.438.473.914.481 – melatonin
- MeSH D03.438.473.914.700 – psilocybine
- MeSH D03.438.473.914.814 – serotonin
- MeSH D03.438.473.914.814.150 – bufotenin
- MeSH D03.438.473.914.814.150.500 – methoxydimethyltryptamines
- MeSH D03.438.473.914.814.400 – 5-methoxytryptamine
- MeSH D03.438.473.914.907 – sumatriptan

==== MeSH D03.438.531 – isoquinolines ====
- MeSH D03.438.531.085 – benzylisoquinolines
- MeSH D03.438.531.085.061 – atracurium
- MeSH D03.438.531.085.077 – bicuculline
- MeSH D03.438.531.085.666 – papaverine
- MeSH D03.438.531.085.666.850 – tetrahydropapaveroline
- MeSH D03.438.531.085.888 – tretoquinol
- MeSH D03.438.531.205 – debrisoquin
- MeSH D03.438.531.321 – emetine
- MeSH D03.438.531.400 – 1-(5-isoquinolinesulfonyl)-2-methylpiperazine
- MeSH D03.438.531.520 – nelfinavir
- MeSH D03.438.531.535 – nomifensine
- MeSH D03.438.531.567 – noscapine
- MeSH D03.438.531.690 – praziquantel
- MeSH D03.438.531.770 – saquinavir
- MeSH D03.438.531.820 – tetrahydroisoquinolines
- MeSH D03.438.531.820.500 – salsoline alkaloids

==== MeSH D03.438.612 – naphthyridines ====
- MeSH D03.438.612.500 – nalidixic acid

==== MeSH D03.438.733 – pteridines ====
- MeSH D03.438.733.315 – flavins
- MeSH D03.438.733.315.650 – riboflavin
- MeSH D03.438.733.315.650.249 – flavin-adenine dinucleotide
- MeSH D03.438.733.315.650.500 – flavin mononucleotide
- MeSH D03.438.733.631 – pterins
- MeSH D03.438.733.631.192 – aminopterin
- MeSH D03.438.733.631.192.500 – methotrexate
- MeSH D03.438.733.631.202 – biopterin
- MeSH D03.438.733.631.202.500 – neopterin
- MeSH D03.438.733.631.400 – folic acid
- MeSH D03.438.733.631.400.600 – pteroylpolyglutamic acids
- MeSH D03.438.733.631.400.800 – tetrahydrofolates
- MeSH D03.438.733.631.400.800.350 – formyltetrahydrofolates
- MeSH D03.438.733.631.400.800.350.450 – leucovorin
- MeSH D03.438.733.631.825 – xanthopterin
- MeSH D03.438.733.900 – triamterene

==== MeSH D03.438.759 – purines ====
- MeSH D03.438.759.138 – adenine
- MeSH D03.438.759.138.050 – 2-aminopurine
- MeSH D03.438.759.138.525 – cytokinins
- MeSH D03.438.759.138.525.350 – isopentenyladenosine
- MeSH D03.438.759.138.525.400 – kinetin
- MeSH D03.438.759.138.525.700 – zeatin
- MeSH D03.438.759.160 – allopurinol
- MeSH D03.438.759.534 – 6-mercaptopurine
- MeSH D03.438.759.534.090 – azathioprine
- MeSH D03.438.759.758 – purinones
- MeSH D03.438.759.758.399 – hypoxanthines
- MeSH D03.438.759.758.399.454 – guanine
- MeSH D03.438.759.758.399.454.250 – acyclovir
- MeSH D03.438.759.758.399.454.250.300 – ganciclovir
- MeSH D03.438.759.758.399.454.300 – azaguanine
- MeSH D03.438.759.758.399.475 – hypoxanthine
- MeSH D03.438.759.758.824 – xanthines
- MeSH D03.438.759.758.824.175 – caffeine
- MeSH D03.438.759.758.824.651 – theobromine
- MeSH D03.438.759.758.824.651.700 – pentoxifylline
- MeSH D03.438.759.758.824.751 – theophylline
- MeSH D03.438.759.758.824.751.075 – aminophylline
- MeSH D03.438.759.758.824.751.162 – dimenhydrinate
- MeSH D03.438.759.758.824.751.250 – dyphylline
- MeSH D03.438.759.758.824.751.500 – 1-methyl-3-isobutylxanthine
- MeSH D03.438.759.758.824.751.950 – xanthinol niacinate
- MeSH D03.438.759.758.824.877 – uric acid
- MeSH D03.438.759.758.824.938 – xanthine
- MeSH D03.438.759.794 – saxitoxin
- MeSH D03.438.759.854 – thioguanine

==== MeSH D03.438.772 – pyrrolizidine alkaloids ====
- MeSH D03.438.772.500 – monocrotaline

==== MeSH D03.438.786 – quinazolines ====
- MeSH D03.438.786.430 – ketanserin
- MeSH D03.438.786.535 – methaqualone
- MeSH D03.438.786.560 – metolazone
- MeSH D03.438.786.750 – prazosin
- MeSH D03.438.786.750.200 – doxazosin
- MeSH D03.438.786.910 – tetrodotoxin
- MeSH D03.438.786.925 – trimetrexate

==== MeSH D03.438.810 – quinolines ====
- MeSH D03.438.810.050 – aminoquinolines
- MeSH D03.438.810.050.060 – amodiaquine
- MeSH D03.438.810.050.180 – chloroquine
- MeSH D03.438.810.050.180.350 – hydroxychloroquine
- MeSH D03.438.810.050.440 – 4-hydroxyaminoquinoline-1-oxide
- MeSH D03.438.810.050.650 – primaquine
- MeSH D03.438.810.125 – dibucaine
- MeSH D03.438.810.200 – ethoxyquin
- MeSH D03.438.810.350 – hydroxyquinolines
- MeSH D03.438.810.350.250 – decoquinate
- MeSH D03.438.810.350.400 – kynurenic acid
- MeSH D03.438.810.350.600 – oxamniquine
- MeSH D03.438.810.350.625 – oxyquinoline
- MeSH D03.438.810.350.625.250 – chloroquinolinols
- MeSH D03.438.810.350.625.250.260 – chlorquinaldol
- MeSH D03.438.810.350.625.400 – clioquinol
- MeSH D03.438.810.350.625.420 – iodoquinol
- MeSH D03.438.810.350.700 – procaterol
- MeSH D03.438.810.410 – mefloquine
- MeSH D03.438.810.470 – nitroquinolines
- MeSH D03.438.810.470.450 – 4-nitroquinoline-1-oxide
- MeSH D03.438.810.470.600 – oxamniquine
- MeSH D03.438.810.553 – pyrroloiminoquinones
- MeSH D03.438.810.637 – quinaldines
- MeSH D03.438.810.699 – quinidine
- MeSH D03.438.810.762 – quinine
- MeSH D03.438.810.824 – quinolinium compounds
- MeSH D03.438.810.824.200 – dequalinium
- MeSH D03.438.810.824.700 – pyrvinium compounds
- MeSH D03.438.810.835 – quinolones
- MeSH D03.438.810.835.055 – 4-quinolones
- MeSH D03.438.810.835.055.500 – nalidixic acid
- MeSH D03.438.810.835.055.550 – nedocromil
- MeSH D03.438.810.835.055.580 – oxolinic acid
- MeSH D03.438.810.835.188 – carteolol
- MeSH D03.438.810.835.322 – fluoroquinolones
- MeSH D03.438.810.835.322.186 – ciprofloxacin
- MeSH D03.438.810.835.322.186.400 – fleroxacin
- MeSH D03.438.810.835.322.280 – enoxacin
- MeSH D03.438.810.835.322.374 – norfloxacin
- MeSH D03.438.810.835.322.500 – ofloxacin
- MeSH D03.438.810.835.322.750 – pefloxacin
- MeSH D03.438.810.835.661 – pqq cofactor
- MeSH D03.438.810.842 – quinpirole
- MeSH D03.438.810.850 – quipazine
- MeSH D03.438.810.900 – saquinavir

==== MeSH D03.438.834 – quinolizines ====
- MeSH D03.438.834.700 – 2h-benzo(a)quinolizin-2-ol, 2-ethyl-1,3,4,6,7,11b-hexahydro-3-isobutyl-9,10-dimethoxy-
- MeSH D03.438.834.775 – sparteine
- MeSH D03.438.834.850 – tetrabenazine

==== MeSH D03.438.857 – quinoxalines ====
- MeSH D03.438.857.140 – carbadox
- MeSH D03.438.857.160 – 6-cyano-7-nitroquinoxaline-2,3-dione
- MeSH D03.438.857.233 – echinomycin
- MeSH D03.438.857.885 – tyrphostins

=== MeSH D03.494 – heterocyclic compounds, 3-ring ===
==== MeSH D03.494.046 – acridines ====
- MeSH D03.494.046.220 – acronine
- MeSH D03.494.046.250 – aminoacridines
- MeSH D03.494.046.250.150 – acridine orange
- MeSH D03.494.046.250.177 – acriflavine
- MeSH D03.494.046.250.200 – aminacrine
- MeSH D03.494.046.250.225 – amsacrine
- MeSH D03.494.046.250.450 – ethacridine
- MeSH D03.494.046.250.650 – nitracrine
- MeSH D03.494.046.250.720 – proflavine
- MeSH D03.494.046.250.760 – quinacrine
- MeSH D03.494.046.250.760.750 – quinacrine mustard
- MeSH D03.494.046.250.900 – tacrine

==== MeSH D03.494.148 – carbazoles ====
- MeSH D03.494.148.249 – ellipticines
- MeSH D03.494.148.500 – ondansetron
- MeSH D03.494.148.750 – staurosporine

==== MeSH D03.494.154 – carbolines ====
- MeSH D03.494.154.333 – harmaline
- MeSH D03.494.154.344 – harmine

==== MeSH D03.494.240 – dibenzazepines ====
- MeSH D03.494.240.127 – carbamazepine
- MeSH D03.494.240.194 – clomipramine
- MeSH D03.494.240.220 – clozapine
- MeSH D03.494.240.281 – desipramine
- MeSH D03.494.240.485 – imipramine
- MeSH D03.494.240.520 – lofepramine
- MeSH D03.494.240.550 – mianserin
- MeSH D03.494.240.625 – opipramol
- MeSH D03.494.240.918 – trimipramine

==== MeSH D03.494.311 – dibenzothiepins ====
- MeSH D03.494.311.250 – dothiepin
- MeSH D03.494.311.520 – methiothepin

==== MeSH D03.494.347 – dibenzoxazepines ====
- MeSH D03.494.347.200 – dibenz(b,f)(1,4)oxazepine-10(11h)-carboxylic acid, 8-chloro-, 2-acetylhydrazide
- MeSH D03.494.347.500 – loxapine
- MeSH D03.494.347.500.040 – amoxapine

==== MeSH D03.494.382 – dibenzoxepins ====
- MeSH D03.494.382.393 – doxepin

==== MeSH D03.494.507 – flavins ====
- MeSH D03.494.507.650 – riboflavin
- MeSH D03.494.507.650.249 – flavin-adenine dinucleotide
- MeSH D03.494.507.650.500 – flavin mononucleotide

==== MeSH D03.494.633 – phenanthridines ====
- MeSH D03.494.633.416 – ethidium
- MeSH D03.494.633.700 – propidium

==== MeSH D03.494.704 – phenazines ====
- MeSH D03.494.704.353 – clofazimine
- MeSH D03.494.704.550 – methylphenazonium methosulfate
- MeSH D03.494.704.600 – neutral red
- MeSH D03.494.704.700 – pyocyanine

==== MeSH D03.494.741 – phenothiazines ====
- MeSH D03.494.741.029 – acepromazine
- MeSH D03.494.741.080 – azure stains
- MeSH D03.494.741.198 – chlorpromazine
- MeSH D03.494.741.326 – fluphenazine
- MeSH D03.494.741.470 – mesoridazine
- MeSH D03.494.741.513 – methotrimeprazine
- MeSH D03.494.741.517 – methylene blue
- MeSH D03.494.741.533 – moricizine
- MeSH D03.494.741.550 – nonachlazine
- MeSH D03.494.741.575 – perazine
- MeSH D03.494.741.593 – perphenazine
- MeSH D03.494.741.639 – prochlorperazine
- MeSH D03.494.741.661 – promazine
- MeSH D03.494.741.670 – promethazine
- MeSH D03.494.741.780 – thiethylperazine
- MeSH D03.494.741.843 – thioridazine
- MeSH D03.494.741.869 – tolonium chloride
- MeSH D03.494.741.898 – trifluoperazine
- MeSH D03.494.741.918 – triflupromazine
- MeSH D03.494.741.939 – trimeprazine

==== MeSH D03.494.770 – psoralens ====
- MeSH D03.494.770.200 – ficusin
- MeSH D03.494.770.300 – khellin
- MeSH D03.494.770.500 – methoxsalen
- MeSH D03.494.770.875 – trioxsalen

==== MeSH D03.494.953 – xanthenes ====
- MeSH D03.494.953.275 – fluoresceins
- MeSH D03.494.953.275.300 – eosine i bluish
- MeSH D03.494.953.275.325 – eosine yellowish-(ys)
- MeSH D03.494.953.275.350 – erythrosine
- MeSH D03.494.953.275.390 – fluorescein
- MeSH D03.494.953.275.400 – fluorescein-5-isothiocyanate
- MeSH D03.494.953.275.700 – rose bengal
- MeSH D03.494.953.558 – propantheline
- MeSH D03.494.953.570 – pyronine
- MeSH D03.494.953.600 – rhodamines
- MeSH D03.494.953.600.500 – rhodamine 123
- MeSH D03.494.953.704 – thioxanthenes
- MeSH D03.494.953.704.250 – chlorprothixene
- MeSH D03.494.953.704.269 – clopenthixol
- MeSH D03.494.953.704.360 – flupenthixol
- MeSH D03.494.953.704.450 – hycanthone
- MeSH D03.494.953.704.500 – lucanthone
- MeSH D03.494.953.704.787 – thiothixene
- MeSH D03.494.953.852 – xanthones
- MeSH D03.494.953.852.388 – lucanthone
- MeSH D03.494.953.852.777 – sterigmatocystin

=== MeSH D03.549 – heterocyclic compounds with 4 or more rings ===
==== MeSH D03.549.095 – aporphines ====
- MeSH D03.549.095.290 – apomorphine

==== MeSH D03.549.168 – berberine alkaloids ====
- MeSH D03.549.168.100 – berberine

==== MeSH D03.549.256 – cevanes ====
- MeSH D03.549.256.310 – germine acetates
- MeSH D03.549.256.543 – protoveratrines
- MeSH D03.549.256.815 – veratrine
- MeSH D03.549.256.815.850 – veratridine

==== MeSH D03.549.439 – ergolines ====
- MeSH D03.549.439.131 – bromocriptine
- MeSH D03.549.439.262 – ergonovine
- MeSH D03.549.439.262.538 – methylergonovine
- MeSH D03.549.439.560 – lisuride
- MeSH D03.549.439.572 – lysergic acid
- MeSH D03.549.439.572.522 – lysergic acid diethylamide
- MeSH D03.549.439.630 – metergoline
- MeSH D03.549.439.689 – methysergide
- MeSH D03.549.439.730 – nicergoline
- MeSH D03.549.439.800 – pergolide

==== MeSH D03.549.562 – ergotamines ====
- MeSH D03.549.562.100 – bromocriptine
- MeSH D03.549.562.150 – dihydroergocornine
- MeSH D03.549.562.200 – dihydroergocristine
- MeSH D03.549.562.250 – dihydroergocryptine
- MeSH D03.549.562.300 – dihydroergotamine
- MeSH D03.549.562.400 – dihydroergotoxine
- MeSH D03.549.562.400.500 – ergoloid mesylates
- MeSH D03.549.562.500 – ergotamine

==== MeSH D03.549.686 – morphinans ====
- MeSH D03.549.686.150 – buprenorphine
- MeSH D03.549.686.165 – butorphanol
- MeSH D03.549.686.260 – dextrorphan
- MeSH D03.549.686.275 – diprenorphine
- MeSH D03.549.686.320 – etorphine
- MeSH D03.549.686.429 – levallorphan
- MeSH D03.549.686.485 – levorphanol
- MeSH D03.549.686.485.382 – dextromethorphan
- MeSH D03.549.686.575 – morphine
- MeSH D03.549.686.575.547 – morphine derivatives
- MeSH D03.549.686.575.547.204 – codeine
- MeSH D03.549.686.575.547.204.540 – hydrocodone
- MeSH D03.549.686.575.547.204.650 – oxycodone
- MeSH D03.549.686.575.547.420 – dihydromorphine
- MeSH D03.549.686.575.547.460 – ethylmorphine
- MeSH D03.549.686.575.547.490 – heroin
- MeSH D03.549.686.575.547.500 – hydromorphone
- MeSH D03.549.686.575.547.500.707 – oxymorphone
- MeSH D03.549.686.575.547.851 – thebaine
- MeSH D03.549.686.639 – nalbuphine
- MeSH D03.549.686.694 – nalorphine
- MeSH D03.549.686.750 – naloxone
- MeSH D03.549.686.750.550 – naltrexone

==== MeSH D03.549.811 – rifamycins ====
- MeSH D03.549.811.650 – rifabutin
- MeSH D03.549.811.650.700 – streptovaricin
- MeSH D03.549.811.700 – rifampin

==== MeSH D03.549.909 – tetrapyrroles ====
- MeSH D03.549.909.249 – bile pigments
- MeSH D03.549.909.249.184 – bilirubin
- MeSH D03.549.909.249.184.200 – biliverdine
- MeSH D03.549.909.249.727 – urobilin
- MeSH D03.549.909.249.852 – urobilinogen
- MeSH D03.549.909.374 – chlorophyll
- MeSH D03.549.909.374.100 – bacteriochlorophylls
- MeSH D03.549.909.374.180 – chlorophyllides
- MeSH D03.549.909.374.700 – pheophytins
- MeSH D03.549.909.374.725 – protochlorophyllide
- MeSH D03.549.909.437 – corrinoids
- MeSH D03.549.909.437.777 – vitamin b 12
- MeSH D03.549.909.437.777.270 – cobamides
- MeSH D03.549.909.437.777.560 – hydroxocobalamin
- MeSH D03.549.909.500 – porphyrins
- MeSH D03.549.909.500.250 – coproporphyrins
- MeSH D03.549.909.500.280 – deuteroporphyrins
- MeSH D03.549.909.500.340 – etioporphyrins
- MeSH D03.549.909.500.462 – hematoporphyrins
- MeSH D03.549.909.500.462.400 – hematoporphyrin derivative
- MeSH D03.549.909.500.462.400.200 – dihematoporphyrin ether
- MeSH D03.549.909.500.620 – mesoporphyrins
- MeSH D03.549.909.500.640 – metalloporphyrins
- MeSH D03.549.909.500.640.220 – chlorophyll
- MeSH D03.549.909.500.640.220.100 – bacteriochlorophylls
- MeSH D03.549.909.500.640.220.180 – chlorophyllides
- MeSH D03.549.909.500.640.220.725 – protochlorophyllide
- MeSH D03.549.909.500.640.587 – heme
- MeSH D03.549.909.500.640.587.462 – hemin
- MeSH D03.549.909.500.700 – porphyrinogens
- MeSH D03.549.909.500.700.250 – coproporphyrinogens
- MeSH D03.549.909.500.700.900 – uroporphyrinogens
- MeSH D03.549.909.500.725 – protoporphyrins
- MeSH D03.549.909.500.880 – uroporphyrins

=== MeSH D03.605 – heterocyclic compounds, bridged-ring ===
==== MeSH D03.605.084 – bicyclo compounds, heterocyclic ====
- MeSH D03.605.084.737 – penicillins
- MeSH D03.605.084.737.124 – amdinocillin
- MeSH D03.605.084.737.124.036 – amdinocillin pivoxil
- MeSH D03.605.084.737.249 – cyclacillin
- MeSH D03.605.084.737.500 – methicillin
- MeSH D03.605.084.737.562 – nafcillin
- MeSH D03.605.084.737.625 – oxacillin
- MeSH D03.605.084.737.625.150 – cloxacillin
- MeSH D03.605.084.737.625.150.205 – dicloxacillin
- MeSH D03.605.084.737.625.150.250 – floxacillin
- MeSH D03.605.084.737.687 – penicillanic acid
- MeSH D03.605.084.737.750 – penicillin g
- MeSH D03.605.084.737.750.050 – ampicillin
- MeSH D03.605.084.737.750.050.050 – amoxicillin
- MeSH D03.605.084.737.750.050.050.060 – amoxicillin-potassium clavulanate combination
- MeSH D03.605.084.737.750.050.075 – azlocillin
- MeSH D03.605.084.737.750.050.500 – mezlocillin
- MeSH D03.605.084.737.750.050.650 – piperacillin
- MeSH D03.605.084.737.750.050.700 – pivampicillin
- MeSH D03.605.084.737.750.050.900 – talampicillin
- MeSH D03.605.084.737.750.170 – carbenicillin
- MeSH D03.605.084.737.750.170.200 – carfecillin
- MeSH D03.605.084.737.750.685 – penicillin g, benzathine
- MeSH D03.605.084.737.750.695 – penicillin g, procaine
- MeSH D03.605.084.737.750.875 – sulbenicillin
- MeSH D03.605.084.737.781 – penicillin v
- MeSH D03.605.084.737.812 – sulbactam
- MeSH D03.605.084.737.875 – ticarcillin
- MeSH D03.605.084.750 – ramipril

==== MeSH D03.605.168 – cyclazocine ====
- MeSH D03.605.168.350 – ethylketocyclazocine

==== MeSH D03.605.497 – morphinans ====
- MeSH D03.605.497.150 – buprenorphine
- MeSH D03.605.497.165 – butorphanol
- MeSH D03.605.497.260 – dextrorphan
- MeSH D03.605.497.280 – diprenorphine
- MeSH D03.605.497.320 – etorphine
- MeSH D03.605.497.429 – levallorphan
- MeSH D03.605.497.485 – levorphanol
- MeSH D03.605.497.485.382 – dextromethorphan
- MeSH D03.605.497.575 – morphine
- MeSH D03.605.497.575.547 – morphine derivatives
- MeSH D03.605.497.575.547.204 – codeine
- MeSH D03.605.497.575.547.204.540 – hydrocodone
- MeSH D03.605.497.575.547.204.650 – oxycodone
- MeSH D03.605.497.575.547.420 – dihydromorphine
- MeSH D03.605.497.575.547.460 – ethylmorphine
- MeSH D03.605.497.575.547.490 – heroin
- MeSH D03.605.497.575.547.500 – hydromorphone
- MeSH D03.605.497.575.547.500.707 – oxymorphone
- MeSH D03.605.497.575.547.851 – thebaine
- MeSH D03.605.497.639 – nalbuphine
- MeSH D03.605.497.694 – nalorphine
- MeSH D03.605.497.750 – naloxone
- MeSH D03.605.497.750.550 – naltrexone

==== MeSH D03.605.687 – quinuclidines ====
- MeSH D03.605.687.637 – quinidine
- MeSH D03.605.687.762 – quinine
- MeSH D03.605.687.800 – quinuclidinyl benzilate

==== MeSH D03.605.869 – tropanes ====
- MeSH D03.605.869.189 – atropine
- MeSH D03.605.869.189.297 – atropine derivatives
- MeSH D03.605.869.189.297.400 – ipratropium
- MeSH D03.605.869.270 – benztropine
- MeSH D03.605.869.388 – cocaine
- MeSH D03.605.869.388.250 – crack cocaine
- MeSH D03.605.869.744 – nortropanes
- MeSH D03.605.869.900 – scopolamine
- MeSH D03.605.869.900.700 – scopolamine derivatives
- MeSH D03.605.869.900.700.200 – butylscopolammonium bromide
- MeSH D03.605.869.900.700.550 – n-methylscopolamine

=== MeSH D03.661 – heterocyclic oxides ===
==== MeSH D03.661.243 – cyclic n-oxides ====
- MeSH D03.661.243.320 – 4-hydroxyaminoquinoline-1-oxide
- MeSH D03.661.243.500 – 4-nitroquinoline-1-oxide
- MeSH D03.661.243.930 – triacetoneamine-n-oxyl

=== MeSH D03.830 – pyrans ===
==== MeSH D03.830.219 – benzopyrans ====
- MeSH D03.830.219.119 – aflatoxins
- MeSH D03.830.219.119.075 – aflatoxin b1
- MeSH D03.830.219.119.100 – aflatoxin m1
- MeSH D03.830.219.240 – chromans
- MeSH D03.830.219.240.190 – catechin
- MeSH D03.830.219.240.225 – centchroman
- MeSH D03.830.219.266 – chromones
- MeSH D03.830.219.266.300 – cromolyn sodium
- MeSH D03.830.219.266.450 – flavonoids
- MeSH D03.830.219.266.450.087 – anthocyanins
- MeSH D03.830.219.266.450.175 – benzoflavones
- MeSH D03.830.219.266.450.175.100 – beta-naphthoflavone
- MeSH D03.830.219.266.450.190 – biflavonoids
- MeSH D03.830.219.266.450.206 – catechin
- MeSH D03.830.219.266.450.221 – chalcones
- MeSH D03.830.219.266.450.221.500 – chalcone
- MeSH D03.830.219.266.450.252 – flavanones
- MeSH D03.830.219.266.450.252.500 – hesperidin
- MeSH D03.830.219.266.450.260 – flavones
- MeSH D03.830.219.266.450.260.110 – apigenin
- MeSH D03.830.219.266.450.260.222 – diosmin
- MeSH D03.830.219.266.450.260.444 – flavoxate
- MeSH D03.830.219.266.450.260.555 – luteolin
- MeSH D03.830.219.266.450.268 – flavonolignans
- MeSH D03.830.219.266.450.268.777 – silymarin
- MeSH D03.830.219.266.450.284 – flavonols
- MeSH D03.830.219.266.450.284.388 – kaempferols
- MeSH D03.830.219.266.450.284.777 – quercetin
- MeSH D03.830.219.266.450.284.888 – rutin
- MeSH D03.830.219.266.450.284.888.500 – hydroxyethylrutoside
- MeSH D03.830.219.266.450.400 – isoflavones
- MeSH D03.830.219.266.450.400.187 – coumestrol
- MeSH D03.830.219.266.450.400.375 – genistein
- MeSH D03.830.219.266.450.400.687 – pterocarpans
- MeSH D03.830.219.266.450.400.843 – rotenone
- MeSH D03.830.219.266.450.700 – proanthocyanidins
- MeSH D03.830.219.320 – citrinin
- MeSH D03.830.219.446 – coumarins
- MeSH D03.830.219.446.139 – aminocoumarins
- MeSH D03.830.219.446.139.500 – novobiocin
- MeSH D03.830.219.446.280 – chromonar
- MeSH D03.830.219.446.350 – coumestrol
- MeSH D03.830.219.446.400 – esculin
- MeSH D03.830.219.446.520 – 4-hydroxycoumarins
- MeSH D03.830.219.446.520.079 – acenocoumarol
- MeSH D03.830.219.446.520.203 – dicumarol
- MeSH D03.830.219.446.520.451 – ethyl biscoumacetate
- MeSH D03.830.219.446.520.750 – phenprocoumon
- MeSH D03.830.219.446.520.914 – warfarin
- MeSH D03.830.219.446.598 – isocoumarins
- MeSH D03.830.219.446.677 – ochratoxins
- MeSH D03.830.219.446.794 – psoralens
- MeSH D03.830.219.446.794.200 – ficusin
- MeSH D03.830.219.446.794.300 – khellin
- MeSH D03.830.219.446.794.500 – methoxsalen
- MeSH D03.830.219.446.794.875 – trioxsalen
- MeSH D03.830.219.446.853 – pyranocoumarins
- MeSH D03.830.219.446.912 – umbelliferones
- MeSH D03.830.219.446.912.326 – coumaphos
- MeSH D03.830.219.446.912.531 – hymecromone
- MeSH D03.830.219.446.912.850 – scopoletin
- MeSH D03.830.219.455 – cromakalim
- MeSH D03.830.219.500 – ellagic acid
- MeSH D03.830.219.600 – hematoxylin
- MeSH D03.830.219.909 – vitamin e
- MeSH D03.830.219.909.750 – tocopherols
- MeSH D03.830.219.909.750.249 – alpha-tocopherol
- MeSH D03.830.219.909.750.374 – beta-tocopherol
- MeSH D03.830.219.909.750.500 – gamma-tocopherol
- MeSH D03.830.219.909.875 – tocotrienols

==== MeSH D03.830.718 – pyrones ====
The list continues at List of MeSH codes (D04).
