= C10H15N5 =

The molecular formula C_{10}H_{15}N_{5} (molar mass: 205.26 g/mol, exact mass: 205.1327 u) may refer to:

- Phenformin
- Trapidil
