= C20H19NO3 =

The molecular formula C_{20}H_{19}NO_{3} (molar mass: 321.37 g/mol, exact mass: 321.1365 u) may refer to:

- Acronine
- Pyriproxyfen
