= Glaucarubin =

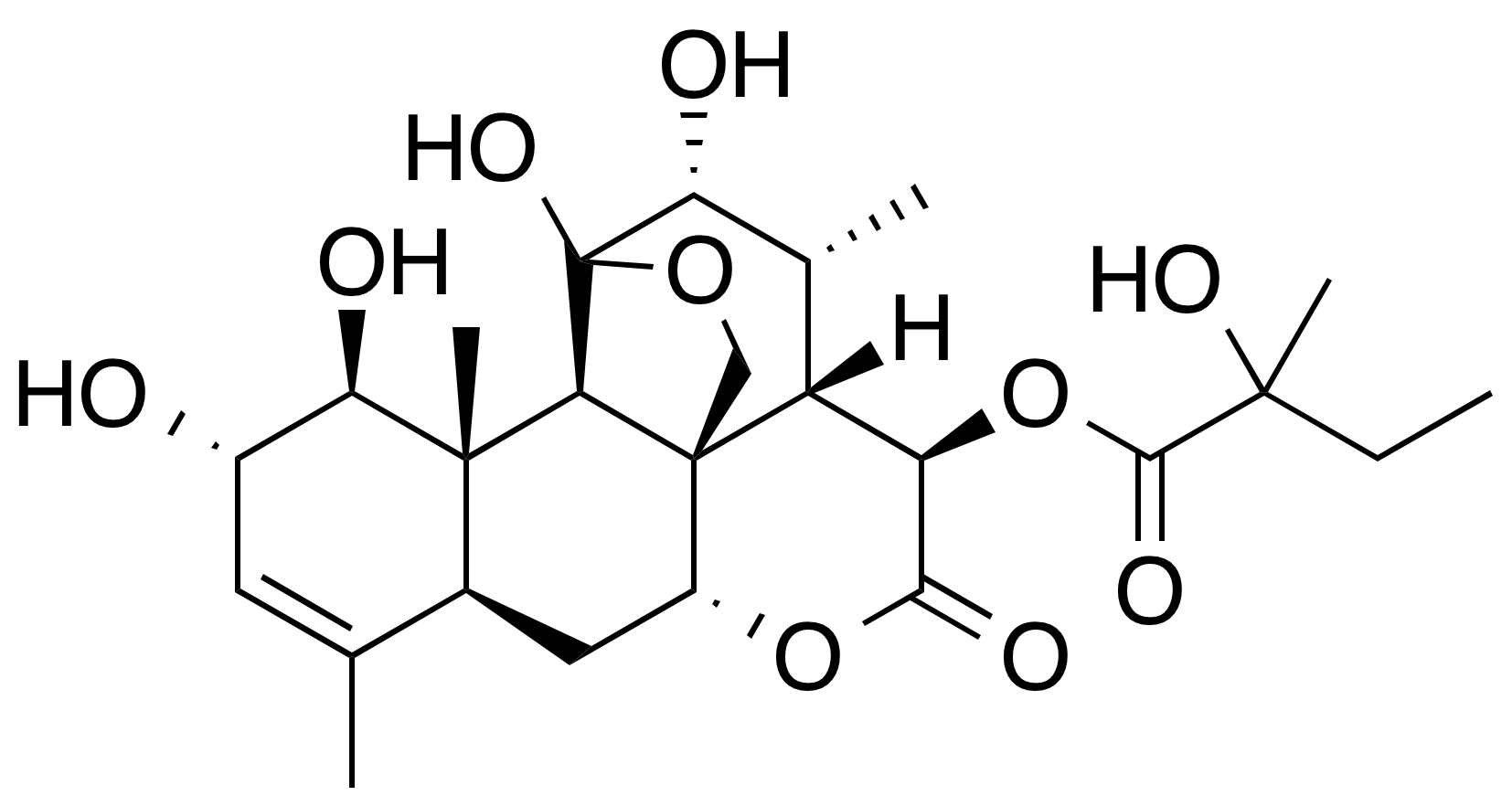

Names
- IUPAC name (1β,2α,11β,12α,15β(S))-11,20-Epoxy-1,2,11,12-tetrahydroxy-15-(2-hydroxy-2-methyl-1-oxobutoxy)picras-3-en-16-one
- Other names Simarubaceae, Glarubin, Glaumeba, Glaucarubine, 2-hydroxy-2-methylbutyric acid 4-ester with 1,2,3,3ab,4,6ab,7,7aa,10,11,11a,11ba-dodecahydro-1a,2a,4b,10a,11b-pentahydroxy-3a,8,11ab-trimethyl-5H-1,11cb-(epoxymethano)phenanthro[10,1-bc]pyran-5-one; α-kirondrin

Identifiers
CAS Number	1448-23-3
3D model (JSmol)	Interactive image
ChEBI	CHEBI:5370
ChEMBL	ChEMBL1997250
ChemSpider	390386
KEGG	C08760
MeSH	D005900
PubChem CID	56840806
UNII	EH6H7VS52J
- InChI: InChI=1S/C25H36O10/c1-6-22(4,31)21(30)35-16-15-11(3)17(27)25(32)20-23(5)12(10(2)7-13(26)18(23)28)8-14(34-19(16)29)24(15,20)9-33-25/h7,11-18,20,26-28,31-32H,6,8-9H2,1-5H3/t11-,12+,13+,14-,15-,16-,17-,18-,20-,22?,23-,24+,25?/m1/s1 Key: LZKVXMYVBSNXER-YZPKDWIXSA-N
- SMILES: CCC(C)(C(=O)O[C@@H]1[C@H]2[C@H]([C@H](C3([C@H]4[C@@]2(CO3)[C@@H](C[C@@H]5[C@@]4([C@@H]([C@H](C=C5C)O)O)C)OC1=O)O)O)C)O

Properties
Chemical formula	C_{25}H_{36}O_{10}
Molar mass	496.553 g·mol^{−1}
Melting point	185–186 °C (365–367 °F; 458–459 K)
Solubility in water	Insoluble in aq sodium bicarbonate solutions. Slightly soluble in water.
Chiral rotation ([α]_{D})	+45° (c = 1.7 in pyridine); +69° (c = 0.6 in methanol)

Hazards
- Occupational safety and health (OHS/OSH)
Main hazards	Cytotoxic
- Except where otherwise noted, data are given for materials in their standard state (at 25 °C [77 °F], 100 kPa). Infobox references

Glaucarubin is a quassinoid derived from the tropical shrub, Simarouba glauca. It is used as an antiamoebic agent.

== Structure and properties ==
Glaucarubin is a bitter lactone found in Simaruba glauca. The compound is an acidic amino acid transporter, which is potassium-dependent and is often found in neuronal tissue.

== Uses in medicine ==
Glaucarubin has been tested for the treatment of amebiasis, an infection of the intestines caused by Entamoeba histolytica. In one clinical trial, cure-rates of around 70% were observed, with few side-effects. In a clinical trial comparing various treatment options for intestinal amoebiasis, patients treated with glaucarubin had a relapse rate of 12%, four times the rate of those treated with emetine–bismuth iodide.

== Toxicity ==
Being a cytotoxin, glaucarubin is capable of killing cells, which is why it has been tested as an anti-cancer drug. Although it helps in the process of killing the uncontrollable cancer cells, it has the tendency to spread and cause harm to unwanted parts of the body, such as the lymphatic system or the blood stream.
