= Streptonigrin =

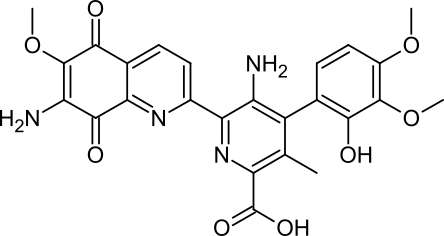

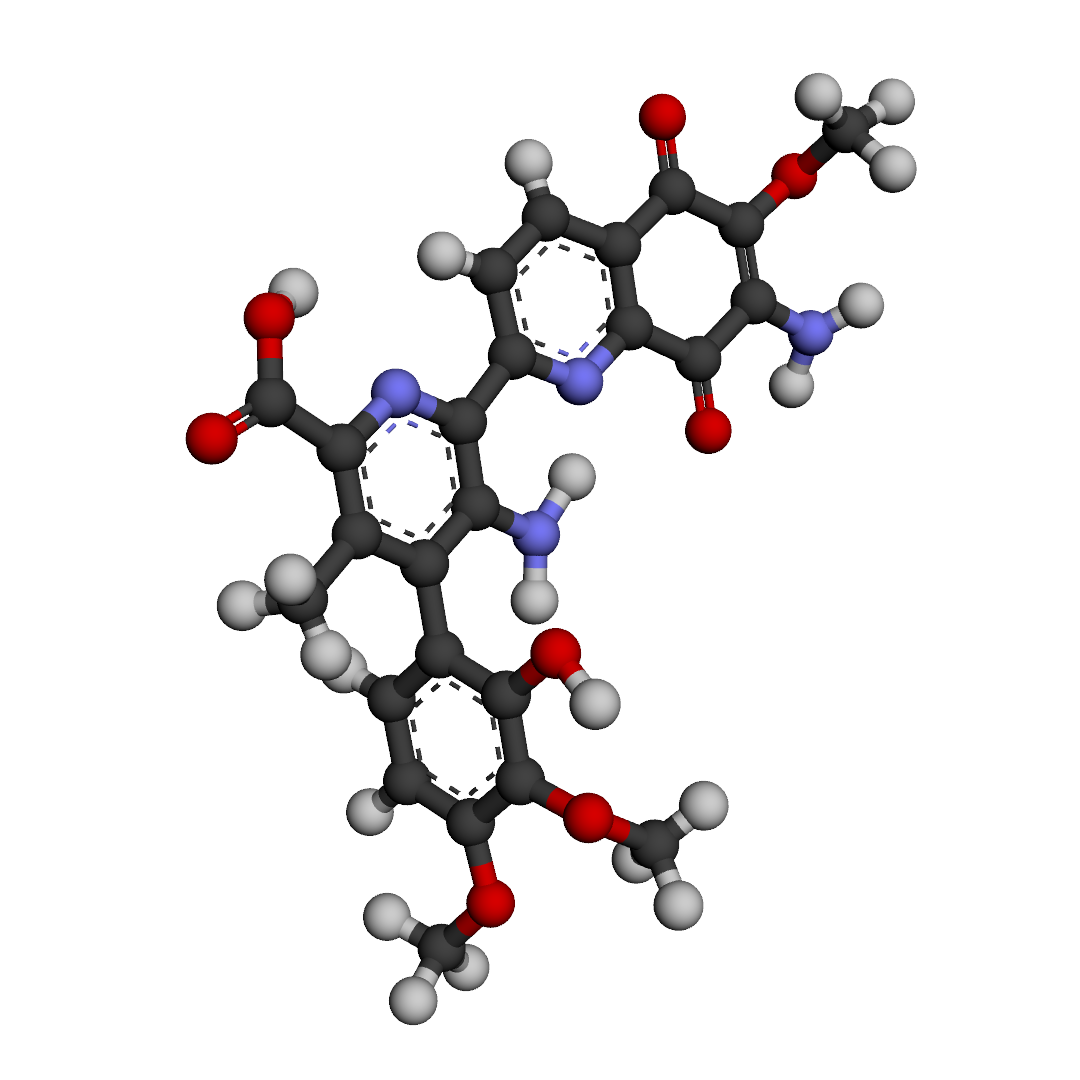

Names
- Preferred IUPAC name 5-Amino-6-(7-amino-6-methoxy-5,8-dioxo-5,8-dihydroquinolin-2-yl)-4-(2-hydroxy-3,4-dimethoxyphenyl)-3-methylpyridine-2-carboxylic acid
- Other names Rufocromomycin, nigrin, bruneomycin

Identifiers
CAS Number	3930-19-6
3D model (JSmol)	Interactive image
Beilstein Reference	599390
ChEBI	CHEBI:9287
ChEMBL	ChEMBL11417
ChemSpider	10207545
ECHA InfoCard	100.021.366
EC Number	223-501-8
Gmelin Reference	1240693
KEGG	C02081
PubChem CID	5298
UNII	261Q3JB310
CompTox Dashboard (EPA)	DTXSID00960034
- InChI: InChI=1S/C25H22N4O8/c1-9-14(10-6-8-13(35-2)23(36-3)20(10)30)15(26)19(29-17(9)25(33)34)12-7-5-11-18(28-12)22(32)16(27)24(37-4)21(11)31/h5-8,30H,26-27H2,1-4H3,(H,33,34) Key: PVYJZLYGTZKPJE-UHFFFAOYSA-N
- SMILES: CC1=C(C(=C(N=C1C(=O)O)C2=NC3=C(C=C2)C(=O)C(=C(C3=O)N)OC)N)C4=C(C(=C(C=C4)OC)OC)O

Properties
Chemical formula	C_{25}H_{22}N_{4}O_{8}
Molar mass	506.471 g·mol^{−1}

Hazards
- GHS labelling
Pictograms	(GHS06: Toxic)
Signal word	Danger
Hazard statements	H300
Precautionary statements	P264, P270, P301+P316, P321, P330, P405, P501
- Except where otherwise noted, data are given for materials in their standard state (at 25 °C [77 °F], 100 kPa). Infobox references

Streptonigrin is an aminoquinone antitumor and antibacterial antibiotic produced by Streptomyces flocculus. It is an inhibitor of nitric oxide-dependent activation of soluble guanylyl cyclase.

The first total synthesis of streptonigrin was published in 1980, a different total synthesis with significantly higher yield was reported in 2011.
