= Anthramycin =

Names
- Preferred IUPAC name (2E)-3-[(11S,11aS)-9,11-Dihydroxy-8-methyl-5-oxo-5,10,11,11a-tetrahydro-1H-pyrrolo[2,1-c][1,4]benzodiazepin-2-yl]prop-2-enamide

Identifiers
CAS Number	4803-27-4
3D model (JSmol)	Interactive image
ChEBI	CHEBI:40699
ChEMBL	ChEMBL2311109
ChemSpider	25056543
PubChem CID	5311005
UNII	0WZD9Y66WN
- InChI: InChI=1S/C16H17N3O4/c1-8-2-4-10-13(14(8)21)18-15(22)11-6-9(3-5-12(17)20)7-19(11)16(10)23/h2-5,7,11,15,18,21-22H,6H2,1H3,(H2,17,20)/b5-3+/t11-,15-/m0/s1 Key: VGQOVCHZGQWAOI-HYUHUPJXSA-N
- SMILES: Cc1ccc2C(=O)N3C=C(C[C@H]3[C@H](O)Nc2c1O)\C=C\C(=O)N

Properties
Chemical formula	C_{16}H_{17}N_{3}O_{4}
Molar mass	315.329 g·mol^{−1}
- Except where otherwise noted, data are given for materials in their standard state (at 25 °C [77 °F], 100 kPa). verify (what is ?) Infobox references

Anthramycin is a pyrrolobenzodiazepine antibiotic with antitumor activity. First derived from the thermophilic actinomycete Streptomyces refuineus by M. D. Tendler and S Korman in the 1950s, it was first successfully synthesized in a laboratory setting by Leimgruber et al. in 1965. Due to the unstable nature of the chemical structure, characterization of the species was done on its epimer, anthrmycin-11-methyl-ether. This derivative can be formed by recrystallization of anthramycin from hot methanol.

== Chemical structure ==
The chemical structure of anthramycin was first elucidated by Leimgruber using nuclear magnetic resonance and ultraviolet spectroscopy. Using another similarly structured fermentation product simply referred to as 'yellow pigment' as a basis of comparison, he was able to identify all major functional groups of the structure. The structure of the species was narrowed down to one of two possible candidates: one with a pyrrolobenzodiazepine nucleus, and another with a pyridoquinazoline skeleton. The first structure was confirmed through the use of mass spectrometry.

== Medical uses ==
Anthramycin is an active anti-tumor agent and antibiotic. It works by inhibiting the synthesis of RNA and DNA of carcinoma cells. It is a competitive inhibitor of cell-free RNA and DNA synthesis, and blocks the action of DNase I. Anthramycin-methyl-ether (AME) forms a complex with DNA which blocks off synthesis by prohibiting DNA binding with proper enzymes. The species is heavily cytotoxic. Anthramycin has been shown particularly effective against sarcomas, lymphomas, and gastrointestinal neoplasms.

== Side effects ==
Use of anthramycin has been largely limited due to a cardiotoxicity so high that it limits dosing. Acute tissue necrosis has also been noted at the injection site of the antibiotic, and side effect of its high cytotoxicity. Repeated injections in mice have been shown to adversely affect mitochondrial metabolism. The mice also showed abnormal electrocardiograms. As such, the side effects of such medication may outweigh the benefits. Alternatives such as doxorubicin are today more widely available and prescribed, due to more mild side effects along with increased anti-tumor action.

== See also ==
- Doxorubicin
- Azithromycin
