= Epirizole =

Anti-inflammatory drug

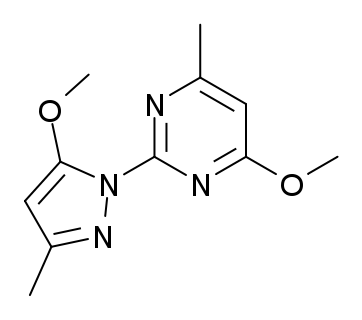

Clinical data
- AHFS/Drugs.com: International Drug Names
- Routes of administration: Oral
- ATC code: none

Legal status
- Legal status: In general: ℞ (Prescription only)

Identifiers
- IUPAC name: 4-methoxy-2-(5-methoxy-3-methylpyrazol-1-yl)-6-methylpyrimidine
- CAS Number: 18694-40-1
- PubChem CID: 3242
- DrugBank: DB08991
- ChemSpider: 3129
- UNII: 3B46O2FH8I
- KEGG: D01394
- CompTox Dashboard (EPA): DTXSID4045422
- ECHA InfoCard: 100.038.627

Chemical and physical data
- Formula: C_{11}H_{14}N_{4}O_{2}
- Molar mass: 234.259 g·mol^{−1}
- 3D model (JSmol): Interactive image
- SMILES: n1c(OC)cc(nc1n2nc(cc2OC)C)C
- InChI: InChI=1S/C11H14N4O2/c1-7-5-9(16-3)13-11(12-7)15-10(17-4)6-8(2)14-15/h5-6H,1-4H3; Key:RHAXSHUQNIEUEY-UHFFFAOYSA-N

Epirizole (INN) is a nonsteroidal anti-inflammatory drug.
