= Carfecillin =

Chemical compound

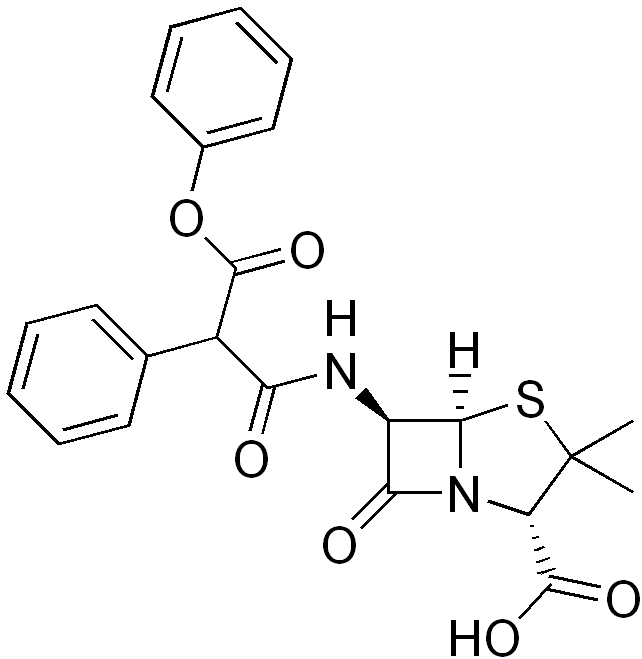

Clinical data
- ATC code: G01AA08 (WHO)

Identifiers
- IUPAC name: (2S,5R,6R)-3,3-dimethyl-7-oxo-6-[ [3-oxo-3-(phenoxy)-2-phenylpropanoyl]amino]-4-thia-1-azabicyclo[3.2.0]heptane-2-carboxylic acid
- CAS Number: 27025-49-6
- PubChem CID: 33672
- ChemSpider: 31054
- UNII: 9UU4XDB74X
- ChEBI: CHEBI:3414
- ChEMBL: ChEMBL1095283
- CompTox Dashboard (EPA): DTXSID10891704
- ECHA InfoCard: 100.043.778

Chemical and physical data
- Formula: C_{23}H_{22}N_{2}O_{6}S
- Molar mass: 454.50 g·mol^{−1}
- 3D model (JSmol): Interactive image
- SMILES: O=C(O)[C@@H]3N4C(=O)[C@@H](NC(=O)C(c1ccccc1)C(=O)Oc2ccccc2)[C@H]4SC3(C)C
- InChI: InChI=1S/C23H22N2O6S/c1-23(2)17(21(28)29)25-19(27)16(20(25)32-23)24-18(26)15(13-9-5-3-6-10-13)22(30)31-14-11-7-4-8-12-14/h3-12,15-17,20H,1-2H3,(H,24,26)(H,28,29)/t15?,16-,17+,20-/m1/s1; Key:NZDASSHFKWDBBU-KVMCETHSSA-N

Carfecillin is a beta-lactam antibiotic. It is a phenyl derivative of carbenicillin, acting as a prodrug.
