= Hymecromone =

Chemical compound

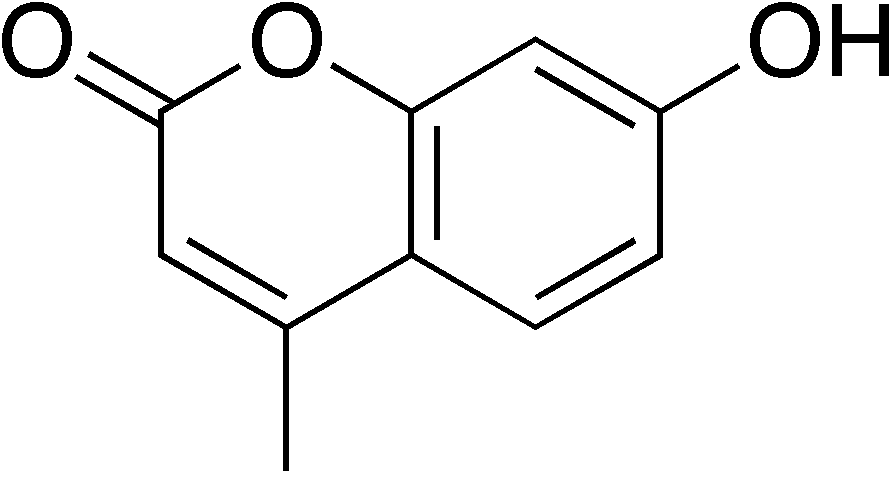

Clinical data
- Other names: 4-Methylumbelliferone
- AHFS/Drugs.com: International Drug Names
- ATC code: A05AX02 (WHO)

Identifiers
- IUPAC name: 7-Hydroxy-4-methylchromen-2-one
- CAS Number: 90-33-5
- PubChem CID: 5280567
- DrugBank: DB07118
- ChemSpider: 4444190
- UNII: 3T5NG4Q468
- KEGG: D00170
- ChEBI: CHEBI:17224
- ChEMBL: ChEMBL12208
- CompTox Dashboard (EPA): DTXSID8025670
- ECHA InfoCard: 100.001.806

Chemical and physical data
- Formula: C_{10}H_{8}O_{3}
- Molar mass: 176.171 g·mol^{−1}
- 3D model (JSmol): Interactive image
- SMILES: CC1=CC(=O)OC2=C1C=CC(=C2)O
- InChI: InChI=1S/C10H8O3/c1-6-4-10(12)13-9-5-7(11)2-3-8(6)9/h2-5,11H,1H3; Key:HSHNITRMYYLLCV-UHFFFAOYSA-N

Hymecromone (4-methylumbelliferone) is a drug used in bile therapy. It is used as choleretic and antispasmodic drugs and as a standard for the fluorometric determination of enzyme activity.

Hymecromone is a crystalline solid with a melting point of 194–195 °C. It is soluble in methanol and glacial acetic acid.

== See also ==
- Umbelliferone
- Coumarin
