= Porfiromycin =

Chemical compound

Clinical data
- Trade names: Promycin
- ATC code: L01

Identifiers
- IUPAC name: [(4S,6S,7R,8S)-11-amino-7-methoxy-5,12-dimethyl-10,13-dioxo-2,5-diazatetracyclo[7.4.0.02,7.04,6]trideca-1(9),11-dien-8-yl]methyl carbamate
- CAS Number: 801-52-5
- PubChem CID: 13116
- DrugBank: DB06478
- ChemSpider: 12565
- UNII: H1WK901OA6
- KEGG: D05572
- ChEMBL: ChEMBL521078
- CompTox Dashboard (EPA): DTXSID901024646

Chemical and physical data
- Formula: C_{16}H_{20}N_{4}O_{5}
- Molar mass: 348.359 g·mol^{−1}
- 3D model (JSmol): Interactive image
- SMILES: CC1=C(C(=O)C2=C(C1=O)N3C[C@H]4[C@@H]([C@@]3([C@@H]2COC(=O)N)OC)N4C)N
- InChI: InChI=1S/C16H20N4O5/c1-6-10(17)13(22)9-7(5-25-15(18)23)16(24-3)14-8(19(14)2)4-20(16)11(9)12(6)21/h7-8,14H,4-5,17H2,1-3H3,(H2,18,23)/t7-,8+,14+,16-,19?/m1/s1; Key:HRHKSTOGXBBQCB-VFWICMBZSA-N

Porfiromycin is an N-methyl derivative of the antineoplastic antibiotic, mitomycin C, which is isolated from various Streptomyces bacterial species. As an antineoplastic agent, it is under investigation for the treatment of cancer, particularly head and neck cancer.

Porfiromycin works by generating oxygen radicals and alkylating DNA, resulting in interstrand cross-links and single-strand breaks. This inhibits DNA synthesis and leads to the death of cancer cells. It has a higher toxicity towards hypoxic cells, making it an attractive option for cancer treatment.

Porfiromycin can increase the risk of methemoglobinemia when taken with certain medications. It belongs to the class of compounds known as mitomycins, which are characterized by their aziridine ring linked to a 7-amino-6-methyl-cyclohexa[b]pyrrolizine-5,8-dione structure.
