= Prajmaline =

Chemical compound

Clinical data
- ATC code: C01BA08 (WHO)

Identifiers
- IUPAC name: (4α,16R,17R,21α)-4-propylajmalan-4-ium-17,21-diol
- CAS Number: 35080-11-6
- PubChem CID: 37042
- ChemSpider: 16735977
- UNII: 75934UD4GJ
- CompTox Dashboard (EPA): DTXSID6023494

Chemical and physical data
- Formula: C_{23}H_{33}N_{2}O_{2}^{+}
- Molar mass: 369.529 g·mol^{−1}
- 3D model (JSmol): Interactive image
- SMILES: O[C@@H]6C4[C@@H]2C[C@]65c1ccccc1N(C)[C@H]5[C@@H]3C[C@H]4[C@H](CC)[C@@H](O)[N+]23CCC
- InChI: InChI=1S/C23H33N2O2/c1-4-10-25-17-11-14(13(5-2)22(25)27)19-18(25)12-23(21(19)26)15-8-6-7-9-16(15)24(3)20(17)23/h6-9,13-14,17-22,26-27H,4-5,10-12H2,1-3H3/q+1/t13-,14-,17-,18-,19?,20-,21+,22+,23+,25?/m0/s1; Key:UAUHEPXILIZYCU-UUEXUKNBSA-N

Prajmaline (Neo-gilurythmal) is a class Ia antiarrhythmic agent which has been available since the 1970s. Class Ia drugs increase the time one action potential lasts in the heart. Prajmaline is a semi-synthetic propyl derivative of ajmaline, with a higher bioavailability than its predecessor. It acts to stop arrhythmias of the heart through a frequency-dependent block of cardiac sodium channels.

== Mechanism ==
Prajmaline causes a resting block in the heart. A resting block is the depression of a person's Vmax after a resting period. This effect is seen more in the atrium than the ventricle. The effects of some Class I antiarrhythmics are only seen in a patient who has a normal heart rate (~1 Hz). This is due to the effect of a phenomenon called reverse use dependence. The higher the heart rate, the less effect Prajmaline will have.

== Uses ==
The drug Prajmaline has been used to treat a number of cardiac disorders. These include: coronary artery disease, angina, paroxysmal tachycardia and Wolff–Parkinson–White syndrome. Prajmaline has been indicated in the treatment of certain disorders where other antiarrhythmic drugs were not effective.

== Administration ==
Prajmaline can be administered orally, parenterally or intravenously. Three days after the last dose, a limited effect has been observed. Therefore, it has been suggested that treatment of arrhythmias with Prajmaline must be continuous to see acceptable results.

== Pharmacokinetics ==
The main metabolites of Prajmaline are: 21-carboxyprajmaline and hydroxyprajmaline. Twenty percent of the drug is excreted in the urine unchanged.

Daily therapeutic dose is 40–80 mg. Distribution half-life is 10 minutes. Plasma protein binding is 60%. Oral bioavailability is 80%. Elimination half-life is 6 hours. Volume of distribution is 4-5 L/kg.

== Side Effects ==
There are no significant adverse side-effects of Prajmaline when taken alone and with a proper dosage. Patients who are taking other treatments for their symptoms (e.g. beta blockers and nifedipine) have developed minor transient conduction defects when given Prajmaline.

== Overdose ==
An overdose of Prajmaline is possible. The range of symptoms seen during a Prajmaline overdose include: no symptoms, nausea/vomiting, bradycardia, tachycardia, hypotension, and death.

== Other Potential Uses ==
Due to Prajmaline's sodium channel-blocking properties, it has been shown to protect rat white matter from anoxia (82 +/- 15%). The concentration used causes little suppression of the preanoxic response.
