= Piromidic acid =

Chemical compound

Clinical data
- AHFS/Drugs.com: International Drug Names
- ATC code: J01MB03 (WHO)

Identifiers
- IUPAC name: 8-Ethyl-5-oxo-2-pyrrolidin-1-yl-5,8-dihydropyrido[2,3-d]pyrimidine-6-carboxylic acid
- CAS Number: 19562-30-2
- PubChem CID: 4855
- ChemSpider: 4689
- UNII: 3I12WH4EWF
- KEGG: D01431
- ChEBI: CHEBI:32019
- CompTox Dashboard (EPA): DTXSID4045424
- ECHA InfoCard: 100.039.223

Chemical and physical data
- Formula: C_{14}H_{16}N_{4}O_{3}
- Molar mass: 288.307 g·mol^{−1}
- 3D model (JSmol): Interactive image
- SMILES: CCN1C=C(C(=O)C2=CN=C(N=C21)N3CCCC3)C(=O)O
- InChI: InChI=1S/C14H16N4O3/c1-2-17-8-10(13(20)21)11(19)9-7-15-14(16-12(9)17)18-5-3-4-6-18/h7-8H,2-6H2,1H3,(H,20,21); Key:RCIMBBZXSXFZBV-UHFFFAOYSA-N

Piromidic acid is a quinolone antibiotic.
