= Xanthinol =

Chemical compound

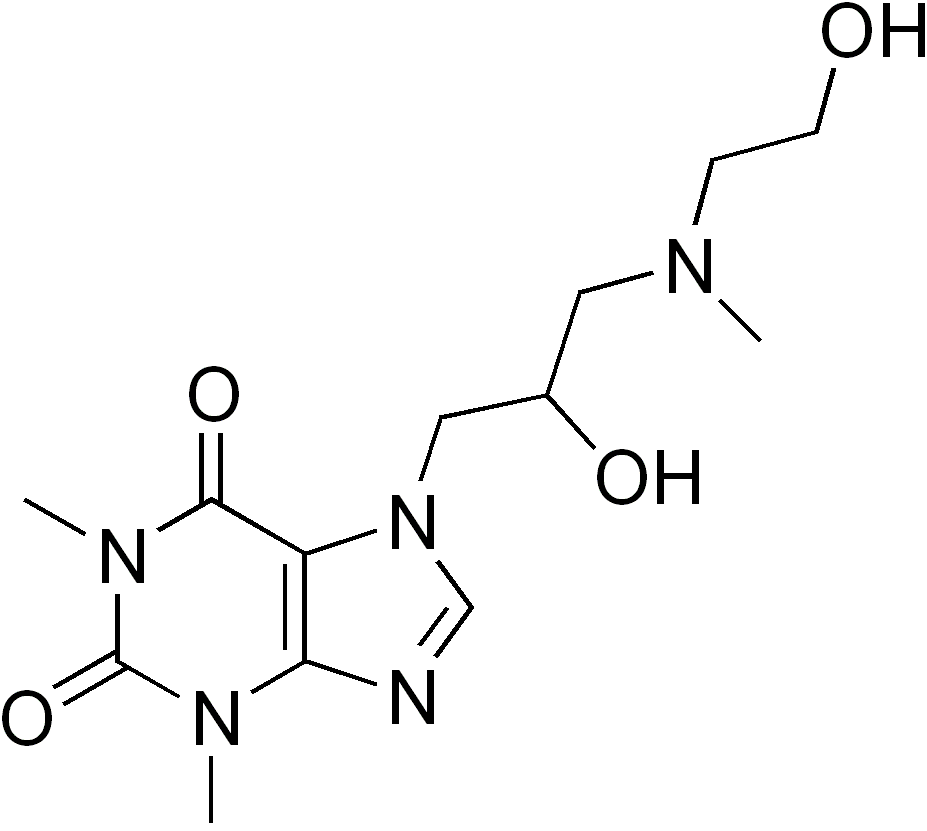

Clinical data
- ATC code: none

Identifiers
- IUPAC name: 7-[2-hydroxy-3-(2-hydroxyethyl-methylamino)propyl]-1,3-dimethylpurine-2,6-dione
- CAS Number: 2530-97-4
- PubChem CID: 9913
- DrugBank: 1
- ChemSpider: 9526
- UNII: TN1B5910V2
- CompTox Dashboard (EPA): DTXSID1048255

Chemical and physical data
- Formula: C_{13}H_{21}N_{5}O_{4}
- Molar mass: 311.342 g·mol^{−1}
- 3D model (JSmol): Interactive image
- SMILES: O=C2N(c1ncn(c1C(=O)N2C)CC(O)CN(CCO)C)C
- InChI: InChI=1S/C13H21N5O4/c1-15(4-5-19)6-9(20)7-18-8-14-11-10(18)12(21)17(3)13(22)16(11)2/h8-9,19-20H,4-7H2,1-3H3; Key:DSFGXPJYDCSWTA-UHFFFAOYSA-N

Xanthinol is a drug prepared from theophylline used as a vasodilator. It is most often used as the salt with niacin (nicotinic acid), known as xanthinol nicotinate. It is a derivative of vitamin B3 (niacin), and can be found in a wide array dietary supplements. It has been marketed to increase the brain metabolism of glucose and ability to obtain ATP. Xanthinol is also used as an agent to reduced cholesterol as it is a vasodilator. It was approved as a medication in Canada in 1998, but it has since had its classification as a medication withdrawn. Xanthinol is indicated to improve cerebrovascular and peripheral vascular disorders as well as hyperlipidemias.

== Mechanism of action ==
Xanthinol, as a positively charged ion, may increase the transportation of nicotinic acid into the cell since the later cannot freely diffuse through the cell membrane. The mechanism of action may be related to the mechanisms of the nucleotides NAD and NADP influence in the cell metabolism. Nicotinic acid is a coenzyme for multiple proteins involved in tissue respiration (Embden-Meyerhof and citrate cycle). The effect of xanthinol nicotinate causes an increase in glucose metabolism and energy gain.
