= Ethoxzolamide =

Chemical compound

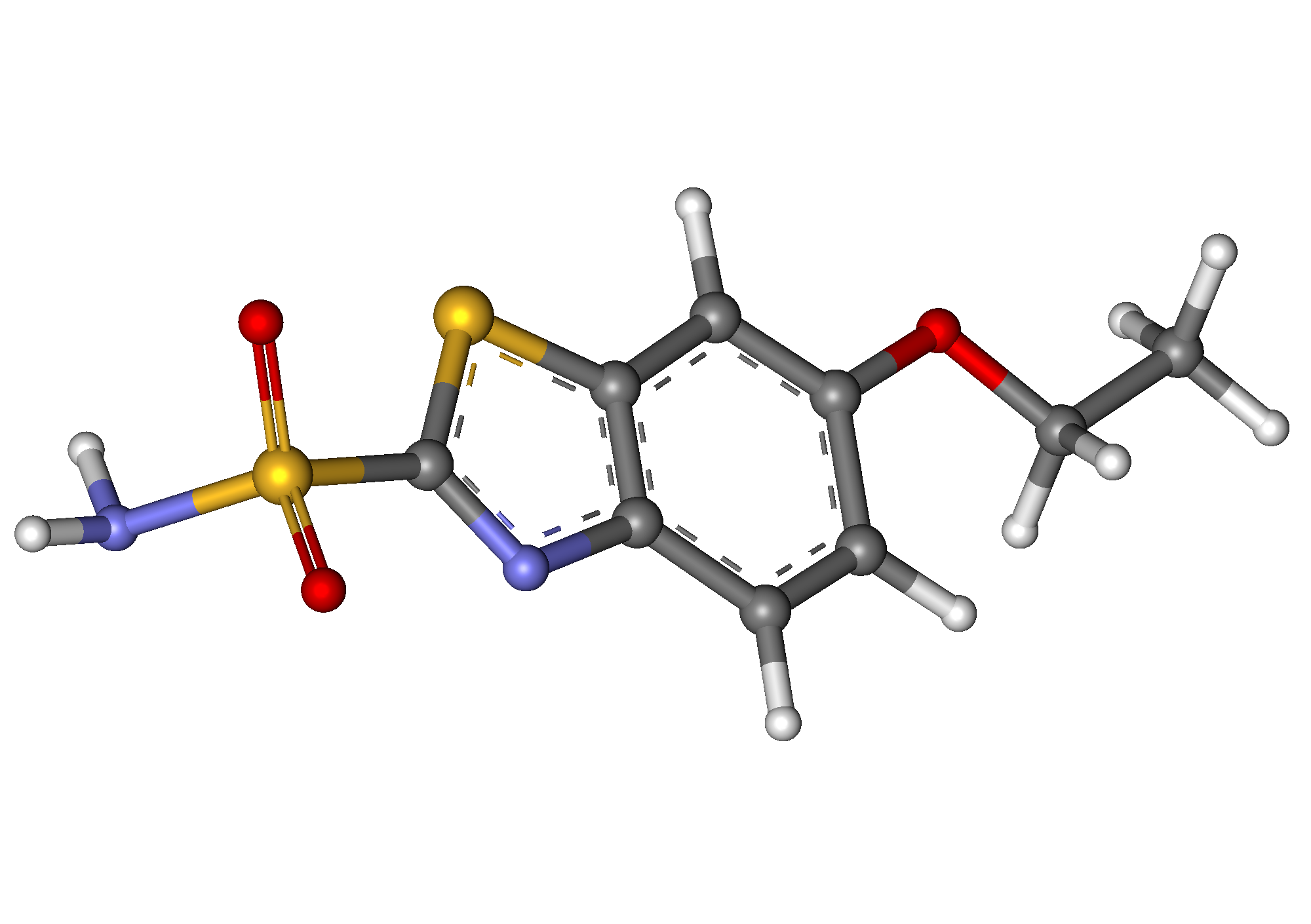

Clinical data
- ATC code: None

Pharmacokinetic data
- Protein binding: ~89%
- Elimination half-life: 2.5–5.5 hours

Identifiers
- IUPAC name: 6-Ethoxy-1,3-benzothiazole-2-sulfonamide
- CAS Number: 452-35-7
- PubChem CID: 3295
- IUPHAR/BPS: 6814
- DrugBank: DB00311
- ChemSpider: 3179
- UNII: Z52H4811WX
- KEGG: D02441
- ChEBI: CHEBI:101096
- ChEMBL: ChEMBL18
- CompTox Dashboard (EPA): DTXSID1023021
- ECHA InfoCard: 100.006.546

Chemical and physical data
- Formula: C_{9}H_{10}N_{2}O_{3}S_{2}
- Molar mass: 258.31 g·mol^{−1}
- 3D model (JSmol): Interactive image
- SMILES: O=S(=O)(c1nc2ccc(OCC)cc2s1)N
- InChI: InChI=1S/C9H10N2O3S2/c1-2-14-6-3-4-7-8(5-6)15-9(11-7)16(10,12)13/h3-5H,2H2,1H3,(H2,10,12,13); Key:OUZWUKMCLIBBOG-UHFFFAOYSA-N

Ethoxzolamide (alternatively known as ethoxyzolamide) is a sulfonamide medication that functions as a carbonic anhydrase inhibitor. It is used in the treatment of glaucoma and duodenal ulcers, and as a diuretic. It may also be used in the treatment of some forms of epilepsy.

== Pharmacology ==
Ethoxzolamide, a sulfonamide, inhibits carbonic anhydrase activity in proximal renal tubules to decrease reabsorption of water, sodium, potassium, bicarbonate. It also decreases carbonic anhydrase in the CNS, increasing the seizure threshold. This reduction in carbonic anhydrase also reduces the intraocular pressure in the eye by decreasing aqueous humor.

== Mechanism of action ==
Ethoxzolamide binds and inhibits carbonic anhydrase I. Carbonic anhydrase plays an essential role in facilitating the transport of carbon dioxide and protons in the intracellular space, across biological membranes and in the layers of the extracellular space. The inhibition of this enzyme effects the balance of applicable membrane equilibrium systems.

== Synthesis ==
Ethoxzolamide synthesis: GB 795174; J. Korman, U.S. patent 2,868,800 (1958, 1959 both to Upjohn).

== See also ==
- Dimazole
- Dithiazanine iodide
