= Naphthylvinylpyridine =

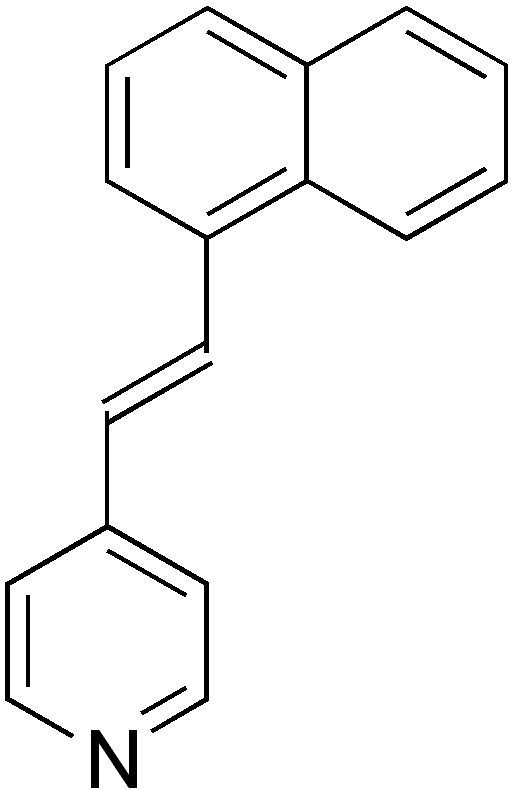

Names
- Preferred IUPAC name 4-[(E)-2-(Naphthalen-1-yl)ethen-1-yl]pyridine

Identifiers
CAS Number	16375-78-3; 16375-56-7 (non-specific)
3D model (JSmol)	Interactive image
ChemSpider	4584076
ECHA InfoCard	100.203.347
MeSH	D009286
PubChem CID	5475238
UNII	XB7DL3H8SX
- InChI: InChI=1S/C17H13N/c1-2-7-17-15(4-1)5-3-6-16(17)9-8-14-10-12-18-13-11-14/h1-13H/b9-8+ Key: FLKDRTOVVLNOLV-CMDGGOBGSA-N
- SMILES: C1=CC=C2C(=C1)C=CC=C2/C=C/C3=CC=NC=C3

Properties
Chemical formula	C_{17}H_{13}N
Molar mass	231.29 g/mol
- Except where otherwise noted, data are given for materials in their standard state (at 25 °C [77 °F], 100 kPa). verify (what is ?) Infobox references

Naphthylvinylpyridine (NVP) is a naphthalene derivative that possesses anticholinergic activity similar to that of atropine. However, NVP's method of acetylcholine (ACh) antagonism involves inhibiting the enzyme choline acetyltransferase.

Several NVP derivatives have been synthesized and evaluated for their ability to inhibit choline acetyltransferase and protect against nerve toxins.
