= Purinones =

Purine

Xanthine

Hypoxanthine

Purinones (oxopurines) are derivatives of purine which have a substituted keto group.

Most are divided into 2 families:

- Hypoxanthines
- Xanthines

Purinones form the central core of numerous pharmaceutical drugs used in a variety therapeutic areas.
