= Ethyl biscoumacetate =

Pharmaceutical drug

Clinical data
- Trade names: Tromexan
- ATC code: B01AA08 (WHO)

Identifiers
- IUPAC name: 3,3-(ethyl acetate-methylene)-bis(4-hydroxycoumarin)
- CAS Number: 548-00-5
- PubChem CID: 11047
- DrugBank: DB08794
- ChemSpider: 10444159
- UNII: 08KL644731
- KEGG: D07131
- ChEMBL: ChEMBL2106261
- CompTox Dashboard (EPA): DTXSID3057771
- ECHA InfoCard: 100.008.128

Chemical and physical data
- Formula: C_{22}H_{16}O_{8}
- Molar mass: 408.362 g·mol^{−1}
- InChI: InChI=1S/C22H16O8/c1-2-28-20(25)15(16-18(23)11-7-3-5-9-13(11)29-21(16)26)17-19(24)12-8-4-6-10-14(12)30-22(17)27/h3-10,15,23-24H,2H2,1H3; Key:JCLHQFUTFHUXNN-UHFFFAOYSA-N

Ethyl biscoumacetate is a vitamin K antagonist.
