= Talampicillin =

Chemical compound

Clinical data
- AHFS/Drugs.com: International Drug Names
- ATC code: J01CA15 (WHO)

Identifiers
- IUPAC name: 3-oxo-1,3-dihydro-2-benzofuran-1-yl (2S,5R,6R)-6-{[(2R)-2-amino-2-phenylacetyl]amino}-3,3-dimethyl-7-oxo-4-thia-1-azabicyclo[3.2.0]heptane-2-carboxylate
- CAS Number: 47747-56-8
- PubChem CID: 5373
- ChemSpider: 64529
- UNII: 29OJI73DPC
- ChEMBL: ChEMBL1322719
- CompTox Dashboard (EPA): DTXSID1048540
- ECHA InfoCard: 100.051.194

Chemical and physical data
- Formula: C_{24}H_{23}N_{3}O_{6}S
- Molar mass: 481.52 g·mol^{−1}
- 3D model (JSmol): Interactive image
- SMILES: O=C(OC2OC(=O)c1ccccc12)[C@@H]4N5C(=O)[C@@H](NC(=O)[C@@H](c3ccccc3)N)[C@H]5SC4(C)C
- InChI: InChI=1S/C24H23N3O6S/c1-24(2)17(22(31)33-23-14-11-7-6-10-13(14)21(30)32-23)27-19(29)16(20(27)34-24)26-18(28)15(25)12-8-4-3-5-9-12/h3-11,15-17,20,23H,25H2,1-2H3,(H,26,28)/t15-,16-,17+,20-,23?/m1/s1; Key:SOROUYSPFADXSN-SUWVAFIASA-N

Talampicillin is a beta lactam antibiotic from the penicillin family. It is an acid stable prodrug that was administered orally. It is not approved by the FDA for use in the United States. It should be avoided in Liver diseases

== Synthesis ==
Ampicillin remains the penicillin of choice for many infections because of its oral activity and good potency against Gram-negative bacteria. A number of prodrugs have been examined in attempts to improve upon the pharmacodynamic characteristics, and one of these is talampicillin.

Talampicillin synthesis:

One synthesis involved protecting the primary amino group of ampicillin (1) as the enamine with ethyl acetoacetate (2). THis was then esterified by reaction with 3-bromopthalide (3), and the enamine was carefully hydrolyzed with dilute HCl in acetonitrile to produce talampicillin (4).
