= Pyranocoumarin =

Chemical compound

Chemical structures of xanthyletin (top) and seselin

Pyranocoumarins are a class of chemical compounds that have a core structure that consists of a pyran ring fused to a coumarin. As phytochemicals, pyranocoumarins are uncommon and found mainly the plant families Apiaceae and Rutaceae. For example, Citrus sinensis and Citrus limonia are sources of xanthyletin and seselin.

In the biosyntheses of pyranocoumarins, the pyran ring is formed via the methylerythritol phosphate pathway and the coumarin is derived from the shikimate pathway.

== See also ==
- Furanocoumarin
