= Flavoxate =

Chemical compound

Clinical data
- AHFS/Drugs.com: Monograph
- MedlinePlus: a682706
- ATC code: G04BD02 (WHO)

Identifiers
- IUPAC name: 2-(1-piperidyl)ethyl 3-methyl-4-oxo-2-phenylchromene-8-carboxylate
- CAS Number: 15301-69-6
- PubChem CID: 3354
- IUPHAR/BPS: 7187
- DrugBank: DB01148
- ChemSpider: 3237
- UNII: 3E74Y80MEY
- KEGG: D07961
- ChEBI: CHEBI:5088
- ChEMBL: ChEMBL1493
- CompTox Dashboard (EPA): DTXSID3023053
- ECHA InfoCard: 100.035.745

Chemical and physical data
- Formula: C_{24}H_{25}NO_{4}
- Molar mass: 391.467 g·mol^{−1}
- 3D model (JSmol): Interactive image
- SMILES: O=C(OCCN1CCCCC1)c4cccc2c4O/C(=C(\C2=O)C)c3ccccc3
- InChI: InChI=1S/C24H25NO4/c1-17-21(26)19-11-8-12-20(23(19)29-22(17)18-9-4-2-5-10-18)24(27)28-16-15-25-13-6-3-7-14-25/h2,4-5,8-12H,3,6-7,13-16H2,1H3; Key:SPIUTQOUKAMGCX-UHFFFAOYSA-N

Flavoxate is an anticholinergic with antimuscarinic effects. Its muscle relaxant properties may be due to a direct action on the smooth muscle rather than by antagonizing muscarinic receptors.

== Clinical uses ==
Flavoxate is used to treat urinary bladder spasms. It is available under the trade name Urispas (Paladin)(India), Genurin (by Recordati, Italy) in Italy and KSA, Uritac by El Saad company in Syria, under the name Bladderon by Nippon Shinyaku of Japan, or Bladuril in Chile, Utispas ( Apex Pharma) in Nepal.

Flavoxate is indicated for symptomatic relief of interstitial cystitis, dysuria, urgency, nocturia, suprapubic pain, frequency and incontinence as may occur in cystitis, prostatitis, urethritis, urethrocystitis or urethrotrigonitis.

== Side effects ==
Flavoxate is generally well tolerated, but can potentially cause vomiting, upset stomach, dry mouth or throat, blurred vision, eye pain, and increased sensitivity of the eyes to light.

== Contraindications ==
Flavoxate is contraindicated in patients who have any of the following obstructive conditions: pyloric or duodenal obstruction, obstructive intestinal lesions or ileus, achalasia, gastrointestinal hemorrhage and obstructive uropathies of the lower urinary tract.
