= Niceritrol =

Chemical compound

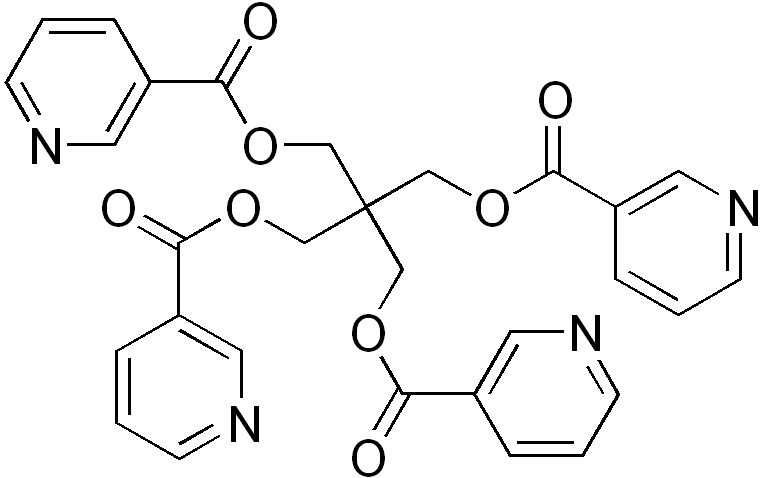

Clinical data
- AHFS/Drugs.com: International Drug Names
- ATC code: C10AD01 (WHO)

Identifiers
- IUPAC name: 3-[(pyridin-3-yl)carbonyloxy]-2,2-bis({[(pyridin-3-yl)carbonyloxy]methyl})propyl pyridine-3-carboxylate
- CAS Number: 5868-05-3
- PubChem CID: 4476
- DrugBank: DB13441
- ChemSpider: 4321
- UNII: F54EHJ34MV
- KEGG: D01754
- CompTox Dashboard (EPA): DTXSID1023364
- ECHA InfoCard: 100.025.017

Chemical and physical data
- Formula: C_{29}H_{24}N_{4}O_{8}
- Molar mass: 556.531 g·mol^{−1}
- 3D model (JSmol): Interactive image
- SMILES: C1=CC(=CN=C1)C(=O)OCC(COC(=O)C2=CN=CC=C2)(COC(=O)C3=CN=CC=C3)COC(=O)C4=CN=CC=C4
- InChI: InChI=1S/C29H24N4O8/c34-25(21-5-1-9-30-13-21)38-17-29(18-39-26(35)22-6-2-10-31-14-22,19-40-27(36)23-7-3-11-32-15-23)20-41-28(37)24-8-4-12-33-16-24/h1-16H,17-20H2; Key:KUEUWHJGRZKESU-UHFFFAOYSA-N

Niceritrol is a niacin derivative used as a hypolipidemic agent. It is an ester of pentaerythritol and nicotinic acid, has general properties similar to those of nicotinic acid (Nicotinamide), to which it is slowly hydrolysed. Niceritrol has been used as a lipid regulating drug in hyperlipidaemias and as a vasodilator in the treatment of peripheral vascular disease.
