= Carboline =

Carboline may refer to the following alkaloid compounds:

- β-Carboline and its derivatives
- γ-Carboline
