= Acronine =

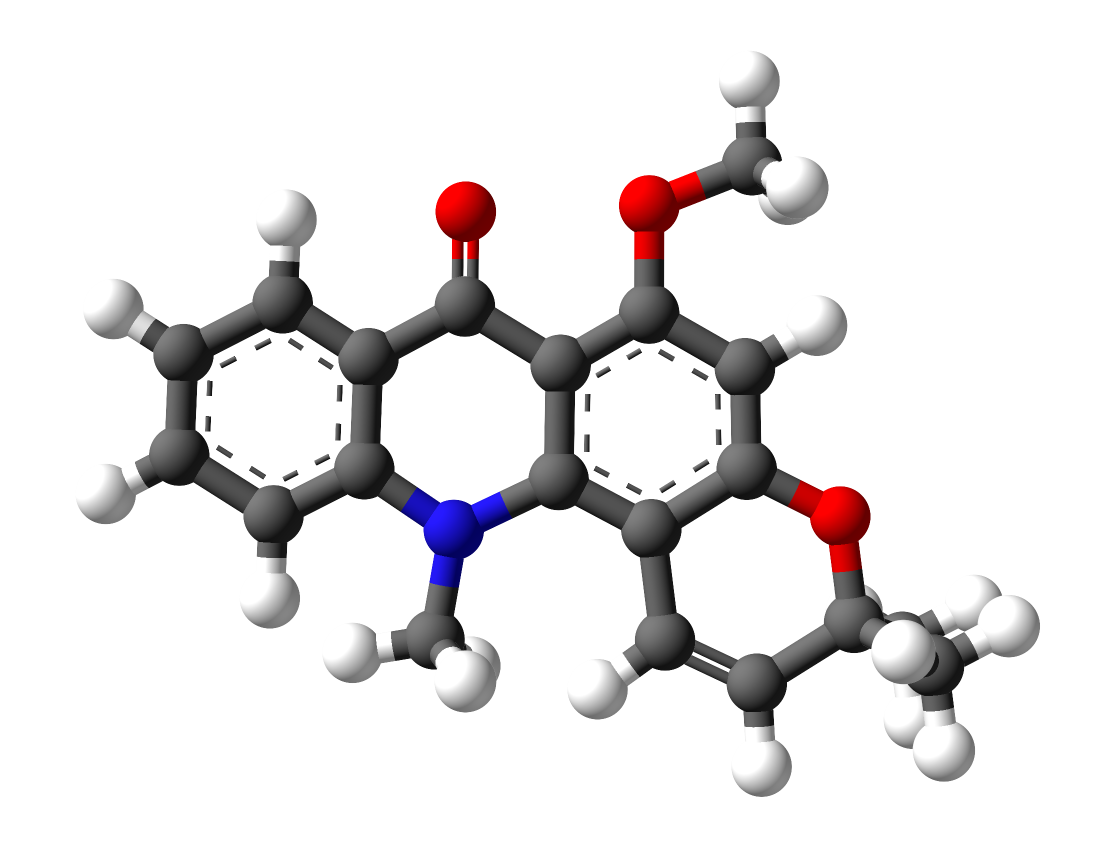

Names
- Preferred IUPAC name 6-Methoxy-3,3,12-trimethyl-3,12-dihydro-7H-pyrano[2,3-c]acridin-7-one
- Other names Acromycine; Acronycine

Identifiers
CAS Number	7008-42-6
3D model (JSmol)	Interactive image
ChEBI	CHEBI:2437
ChEMBL	ChEMBL285852
ChemSpider	306428
KEGG	C10632
MeSH	D000175
PubChem CID	345512
UNII	QE0G097358
CompTox Dashboard (EPA)	DTXSID0020026
- InChI: InChI=1S/C20H19NO3/c1-20(2)10-9-13-15(24-20)11-16(23-4)17-18(13)21(3)14-8-6-5-7-12(14)19(17)22/h5-11H,1-4H3 Key: SMPZPKRDRQOOHT-UHFFFAOYSA-N; InChI=1/C20H19NO3/c1-20(2)10-9-13-15(24-20)11-16(23-4)17-18(13)21(3)14-8-6-5-7-12(14)19(17)22/h5-11H,1-4H3 Key: SMPZPKRDRQOOHT-UHFFFAOYAD
- SMILES: CC1(C=CC2=C3C(=C(C=C2O1)OC)C(=O)C4=CC=CC=C4N3C)C

Properties
Chemical formula	C_{20}H_{19}NO_{3}
Molar mass	321.376 g·mol^{−1}
- Except where otherwise noted, data are given for materials in their standard state (at 25 °C [77 °F], 100 kPa). Infobox references

Acronine is an anti-tumor chemical that has yielded synthetic anti-tumor derivatives.
