= Trapidil =

Chemical compound

Clinical data
- Trade names: Rocornal, Avantrin, Travisco
- AHFS/Drugs.com: International Drug Names
- Routes of administration: By mouth
- ATC code: C01DX11 (WHO)

Legal status
- Legal status: US: Not approved; In general: ℞ (Prescription only)

Identifiers
- IUPAC name: N,N-Diethyl-5-methyl-[1,2,4]triazolo[1,5-a]pyrimidin-7-amine
- CAS Number: 15421-84-8
- PubChem CID: 5531
- ChemSpider: 5330
- UNII: EYG5Y6355E
- CompTox Dashboard (EPA): DTXSID0045416
- ECHA InfoCard: 100.035.834

Chemical and physical data
- Formula: C_{10}H_{15}N_{5}
- Molar mass: 205.265 g·mol^{−1}
- 3D model (JSmol): Interactive image
- SMILES: CCN(CC)c1cc(nc2n1ncn2)C
- InChI: InChI=1S/C10H15N5/c1-4-14(5-2)9-6-8(3)13-10-11-7-12-15(9)10/h6-7H,4-5H2,1-3H3; Key:GSNOZLZNQMLSKJ-UHFFFAOYSA-N

Trapidil is used in the treatment of chronic stable angina pectoris. It is currently marketed in Japan under the brand name Rocornal.

An analog was assigned the codename AR 12-456.

== Pharmacology ==
Based on cell free in vitro activity assays, trapidil at therapeutic concentrations causes selective phosphorylation of cellular proteins through positive modulation of regulatory subunit RII(α/β) containing protein kinase A (PKA). At higher, non-physiologically relevant concentrations, which are generally not achieved after administration of therapeutic doses, non-selective inhibition of phosphodiesterases occurs. Further, the previous documented activities as an antagonist of platelet-derived growth factor are abolished when a PKA inhibitor is administered, suggesting that these noted activities are PKA mediated. At these higher concentrations, additional effects have been noted including vasodilation and inhibition of platelet aggregation
