= Ionophore =

Chemical entity that reversibly binds ions

Carrier and channel ionophores (a) Carrier ionophores reversibly bind ions and carry them through cell membranes. (b) Channel ionophores create channels within cell membranes to facilitate the transport of ions.

In chemistry, an ionophore (from Greek ion and -phore 'ion carrier') is a chemical species that reversibly binds ions. Many ionophores are lipid-soluble entities that transport ions across the cell membrane. Ionophores catalyze ion transport across hydrophobic membranes, such as liquid polymeric membranes (carrier-based ion selective electrodes) or lipid bilayers found in the living cells or synthetic vesicles (liposomes). Structurally, an ionophore contains a hydrophilic center and a hydrophobic portion that interacts with the membrane.

Some ionophores are synthesized by microorganisms to import ions into their cells. Synthetic ion carriers have also been prepared. Ionophores selective for cations and anions have found many applications in analysis. These compounds have also shown to have various biological effects and a synergistic effect when combined with the ion they bind.

== Classification ==
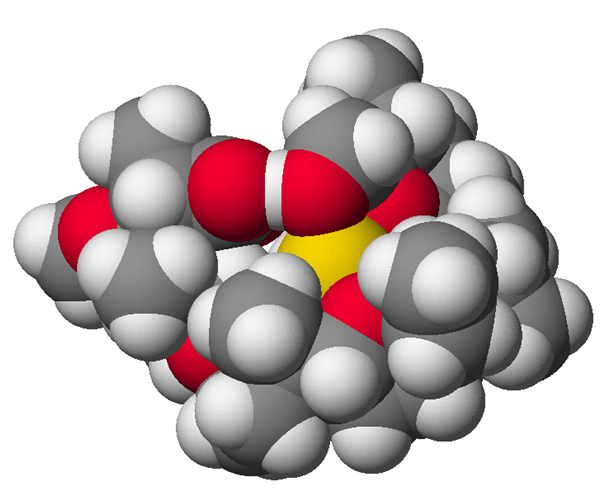
The structure of the complex of sodium (Na^{+}) and the antibiotic monensin A

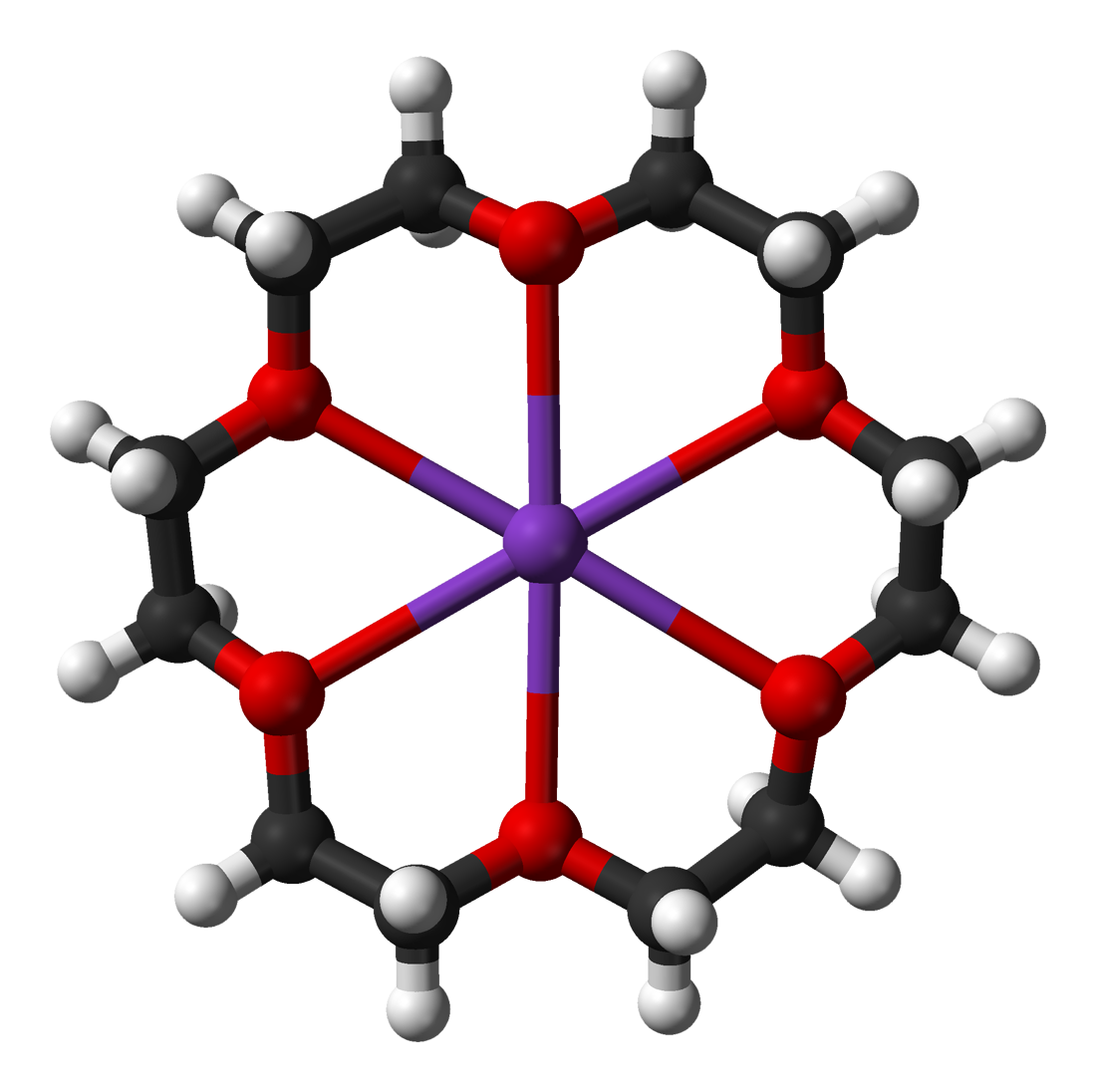
Structure of a potassium complex of a crown ether, a synthetic ionophore-ion complex

Biological activities of metal ion-binding compounds can be changed in response to the increment of the metal concentration, and based on the latter compounds can be classified as "metal ionophores", "metal chelators" or "metal shuttles". If the biological effect is augmented by increasing the metal concentration, it is classified as a "metal ionophore". If the biological effect is decreased or reversed by increasing the metal concentration, it is classified as a "metal chelator". If the biological effect is not affected by increasing the metal concentration, and the compound-metal complex enters the cell, it is classified as a "metal shuttle". The term ionophore (from Greek ion carrier or ion bearer) was proposed by Berton Pressman in 1967 when he and his colleagues were investigating the antibiotic mechanisms of valinomycin and nigericin.

Many ionophores are produced naturally by a variety of microbes, fungi and plants, and act as a defense against competing or pathogenic species. Multiple synthetic membrane-spanning ionophores have also been synthesized. The two broad classifications of ionophores synthesized by microorganisms are:

- Carrier ionophores that bind to a particular ion and shield its charge from the surrounding environment. This makes it easier for the ion to pass through the hydrophobic interior of the lipid membrane. However, these ionophores become unable to transport ions under very low temperatures. An example of a carrier ionophore is valinomycin, a molecule that transports a single potassium cation. Carrier ionophores may be proteins or other molecules.
- Channel formers that introduce a hydrophilic pore into the membrane, allowing ions to pass through without coming into contact with the membrane's hydrophobic interior. Channel forming ionophores are usually large proteins. This type of ionophores can maintain their ability to transfer ions at low temperatures, unlike carrier ionophores. Examples of channel-forming ionophores are gramicidin A and nystatin.

Ionophores that transport hydrogen ions (H^{+}, i.e. protons) across the cell membrane are called protonophores. Iron ionophores and chelating agents are collectively called siderophores.

=== Synthetic ionophores ===
Many synthetic ionophores are based on crown ethers, cryptands, and calixarenes. Pyrazole-pyridine and bis-pyrazole derivatives have also been synthesized. These synthetic species are often macrocyclic. Some synthetic agents are not macrocyclic, e.g. carbonyl cyanide-p-trifluoromethoxyphenylhydrazone. Even simple organic compounds, such as phenols, exhibit ionophoric properties. The majority of synthetic receptors used in the carrier-based anion-selective electrodes employ transition elements or metalloids as anion carriers, although simple organic urea- and thiourea-based receptors are known.

== Mechanism of action ==
Ionophores are chemical compounds that reversibly bind and transport ions through biological membranes in the absence of a protein pore. This can disrupt the membrane potential, and thus these substances could exhibit cytotoxic properties. Ionophores modify the permeability of biological membranes toward certain ions to which they show affinity and selectivity. Many ionophores are lipid-soluble and transport ions across hydrophobic membranes, such as lipid bilayers found in the living cells or synthetic vesicles (liposomes), or liquid polymeric membranes (carrier-based ion selective electrodes). Structurally, an ionophore contains a hydrophilic center and a hydrophobic portion that interacts with the membrane. Ions are bound to the hydrophilic center and form an ionophore-ion complex. The structure of the ionophore-ion complex has been verified by X-ray crystallography.

== Chemistry ==
Several chemical factors affect the ionophore activity. The activity of an ionophore-metal complex depends on its geometric configuration and the coordinating sites and atoms which create coordination environment surrounding the metal center. This affects the selectivity and affinity towards a certain ion. Ionophores can be selective to a particular ion but may not be exclusive to it. Ionophores facilitate the transport of ions across biological membranes most commonly via passive transport, which is affected by lipophilicity of the ionophore molecule. The increase in lipophilicity of the ionophore-metal complex enhances its permeability through lipophilic membranes. The hydrophobicity and hydrophilicity of the complex also determines whether it will slow down or ease the transport of metal ions into cell compartments. The reduction potential of a metal complex influences its thermodynamic stability and affects its reactivity. The ability of an ionophore to transfer ions is also affected by the temperature.

== Biological properties ==
Ionophores are widely used in cell physiology experiments and biotechnology as these compounds can effectively perturb gradients of ions across biological membranes and thus they can modulate or enhance the role of key ions in the cell. Many ionophores have shown antibacterial and antifungal activities. Some of them also act against insects, pests and parasites. Some ionophores have been introduced into medicinal products for dermatological and veterinary use. A large amount of research has been directed toward investigating novel antiviral, anti-inflammatory, anti-tumor, antioxidant and neuroprotective properties of different ionophores.

Chloroquine is an antimalarial and antiamebic drug. It is also used in the management of rheumatoid arthritis and lupus erythematosus. Pyrithione is used as an anti-dandruff agent in medicated shampoos for seborrheic dermatitis. It also serves as an anti-fouling agent in paints to cover and protect surfaces against mildew and algae. Clioquinol and PBT2 are 8-hydroxyquinoline derivatives. Clioquinol has antiprotozoal and topical antifungal properties, however its use as an antiprotozoal agent has widely restricted because of neurotoxic concerns. Clioquinol and PBT2 are currently being studied for neurodegenerative diseases, such as Alzheimer's disease, Huntington's disease and Parkinson's disease. Gramicidin is used in throat lozenges and has been used to treat infected wounds. Epigallocatechin gallate is used in many dietary supplements and has shown slight cholesterol-lowering effects. Quercetin has a bitter flavor and is used as a food additive and in dietary supplements. Hinokitiol (ß-thujaplicin) is used in commercial products for skin, hair and oral care, insect repellents and deodorants. It is also used as a food additive, shelf-life extending agent in food packaging, and wood preservative in timber treatment.

Polyene antimycotics, such as nystatin, natamycin and amphotericin B, are a subgroup of macrolides and are widely used antifungal and antileishmanial medications. These drugs act as ionophores by binding to ergosterol in the fungal cell membrane and making it leaky and permeable for K^{+} and Na^{+} ions, as a result contributing to fungal cell death.

Carboxylic ionophores, i.e., monensin, lasalocid, salinomycin, narasin, maduramicin, semduramycin and laidlomycin, are marketed globally and widely used as anticoccidial feed additives to prevent and treat coccidiosis in poultry. Some of these compounds have also been used as growth and production promoters in certain ruminants, such as cattle, and chickens, however this use has been mainly restricted because of safety issues.

Zinc ionophores have been shown to inhibit replication of various viruses in vitro, including coxsackievirus, equine arteritis virus, coronavirus, HCV, HSV, HCoV-229E, HIV, mengovirus, MERS-CoV, rhinovirus, SARS-CoV-1, Zika virus.

Ionophore	Cations	Sources
This is not a complete list of all known ionophores. The metal ions listed for each ionophore are not exclusive.
Alamethicin	K^{+}, Na^{+}	Trichoderma viride
Beauvericin	Ba^{2+}, Ca^{2+}	Beauveria bassiana, Fusarium species
Calcimycin	Mn^{2+}, Ca^{2+}, Mg^{2+}, Sr^{2+}, Ba^{2+}, Zn^{2+}, Co^{2+}, Ni,^{2+}, Fe^{2+}	Streptomyces chartreusensis
Chloroquine	Zn^{2+}	Cinchona officinalis
Clioquinol	Zn^{2+}, Cu^{2+}, Fe^{2+}	Synthetic ionophore
Diiodohydroxyquinoline	Zn^{2+}	Synthetic ionophore
Dithiocarbamates (pyrrolidine dithiocarbamate and other derivatives)	Zn^{2+}, Cu^{2+}	Synthetic ionophore
Enniatin	NH4^{+}	Fusarium species
Epigallocatechin gallate	Zn^{2+}	Camellia sinensis, apples, plums, onions, hazelnuts, pecans, carobs
Gramicidin A	K^{+}, Na^{+}	Brevibacillus brevis
Hinokitiol	Zn^{2+}	Cupressaceae species
Ionomycin	Ca^{2+}	Streptomyces conglobatus
Laidlomycin	Li^{+}, K^{+}, Na^{+}, Mg^{2+}, Ca^{2+}, Sr^{2+}	Streptomyces species
Lasalocid	K^{+}, Na^{+}, Ca^{2+}, Mg^{2+}	Streptomyces lasalocidi
Maduramicin	K^{+}, Na^{+}	Actinomadura rubra
Monensin	Li^{+}, K^{+}, Na^{+}, Rb^{+}, Ag^{+}, Tl^{+}, Pb^{2+}	Streptomyces cinnamonensis
Narasin	K^{+}, Na^{+}, Rb^{+}	Streptomyces aureofaciens
Nigericin	K^{+}, Pb^{2+}	Streptomyces hygroscopicus
Nonactin	K^{+}, Na^{+}, Rb^{+}, Cs^{+}, Tl^{+}, NH4^{+}	Streptomyces tsukubensis, Streptomyces griseus, Streptomyces chrysomallus, Streptomyces werraensis
Nystatin	K^{+}	Streptomyces noursei
PBT2	Zn^{2+}, Fe^{2+}, Mn^{2+}, Cu^{2+}	Synthetic analogue of 8-hydroxyquinoline
Pyrazole-pyridine and bis-pyrazole derivatives	Cu^{2+}	Synthetic ionophore
Pyrithione	Zn^{2+}, Cu^{2+}, Pb^{2+}	Allium stipitatum
Quercetin	Zn^{2+}	Widely distributed in nature, found in many vegetables, fruits, berries, herbs, trees and other plants
Salinomycin	K^{+}, Na^{+}, Cs^{+}, Sr^{2+}, Ca^{2+}, Mg^{2+}	Streptomyces albus
Semduramicin	Na^{+}, Ca^{2+}	Actinomadura roseorufa
Valinomycin	K^{+}	Streptomyces species
Zincophorin	Zn^{2+}	Streptomyces griseus

== See also ==
- Siderophore
- Protonophore
- Chelation
