= SMON =

SMON may stand for:

- Subacute myelo-optic neuropathy, an epidemic in Japan caused by clioquinol
- SMON, a set of MIB extensions for RMON that allow the monitoring of switching equipment from a single management workstation in far greater detail than offered by RMON
- SMON (Oracle System MONitor), an Oracle background process created when one starts a database instance
- SMon (abbrev. for "system monitor"), a ROM/FLASH-based monitor used on many singleboard computers, such as the Synergy Microsystems' PowerPC-based VGM series.
