= 8-Hydroxyquinoline =

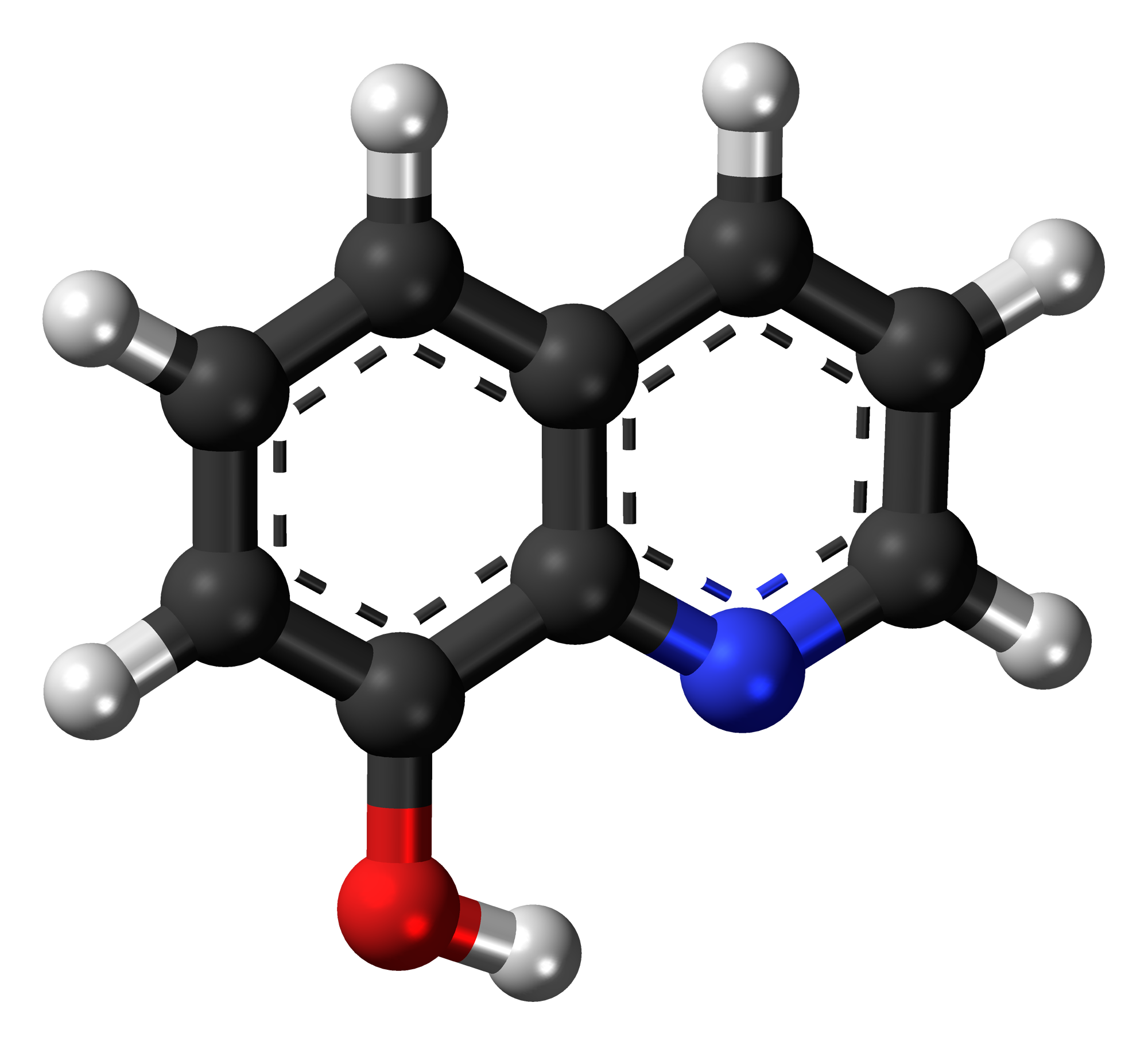

Names
- Preferred IUPAC name Quinolin-8-ol
- Other names 1-Azanaphthalene-8-ol, Fennosan H 30, Hydroxybenzopyridine, Oxybenzopyridine, Oxychinolin, Oxyquinoline, Phenopyridine, Quinophenol, Oxine, 8-Quinolinol

Identifiers
CAS Number	148-24-3
3D model (JSmol)	Interactive image
ChEBI	CHEBI:48981
ChEMBL	ChEMBL310555
ChemSpider	1847
ECHA InfoCard	100.005.193
KEGG	D05321
PubChem CID	1923
UNII	5UTX5635HP
CompTox Dashboard (EPA)	DTXSID5020730
- InChI: InChI=1S/C9H7NO/c11-8-5-1-3-7-4-2-6-10-9(7)8/h1-6,11H Key: MCJGNVYPOGVAJF-UHFFFAOYSA-N; InChI=1/C9H7NO/c11-8-5-1-3-7-4-2-6-10-9(7)8/h1-6,11H Key: MCJGNVYPOGVAJF-UHFFFAOYAG
- SMILES: C1=CC2=C(C(=C1)O)N=CC=C2

Properties
Chemical formula	C_{9}H_{7}NO
Molar mass	145.16 g/mol
Appearance	White crystalline powder
Density	1.034 g/cm^{3}
Melting point	76 °C (169 °F; 349 K)
Boiling point	276 °C (529 °F; 549 K)

Pharmacology
ATC code	G01AC30 (WHO) A01AB07 (WHO) D08AH03 (WHO) R02AA14 (WHO)

Hazards
- GHS labelling
Pictograms	(GHS06: Toxic) (GHS08: Health hazard) (GHS05: Corrosive) (GHS09: Environmental hazard)
Signal word	Danger
Hazard statements	H301, H317, H318, H360D, H410
Precautionary statements	P202, P273, P280, P301+P310, P302+P352, P305+P351+P338
Safety data sheet (SDS)	External MSDS
- Except where otherwise noted, data are given for materials in their standard state (at 25 °C [77 °F], 100 kPa). Infobox references

8-Hydroxyquinoline (also known as oxine) is an organic compound derived from the heterocycle quinoline. A colorless solid, its conjugate base is a chelating agent, which is used for the quantitative determination of metal ions.

In aqueous solution 8-hydroxyquinoline has a pK_{a} value of ca. 9.9 It reacts with metal ions, losing the proton and forming 8-hydroxyquinolinato-chelate complexes.

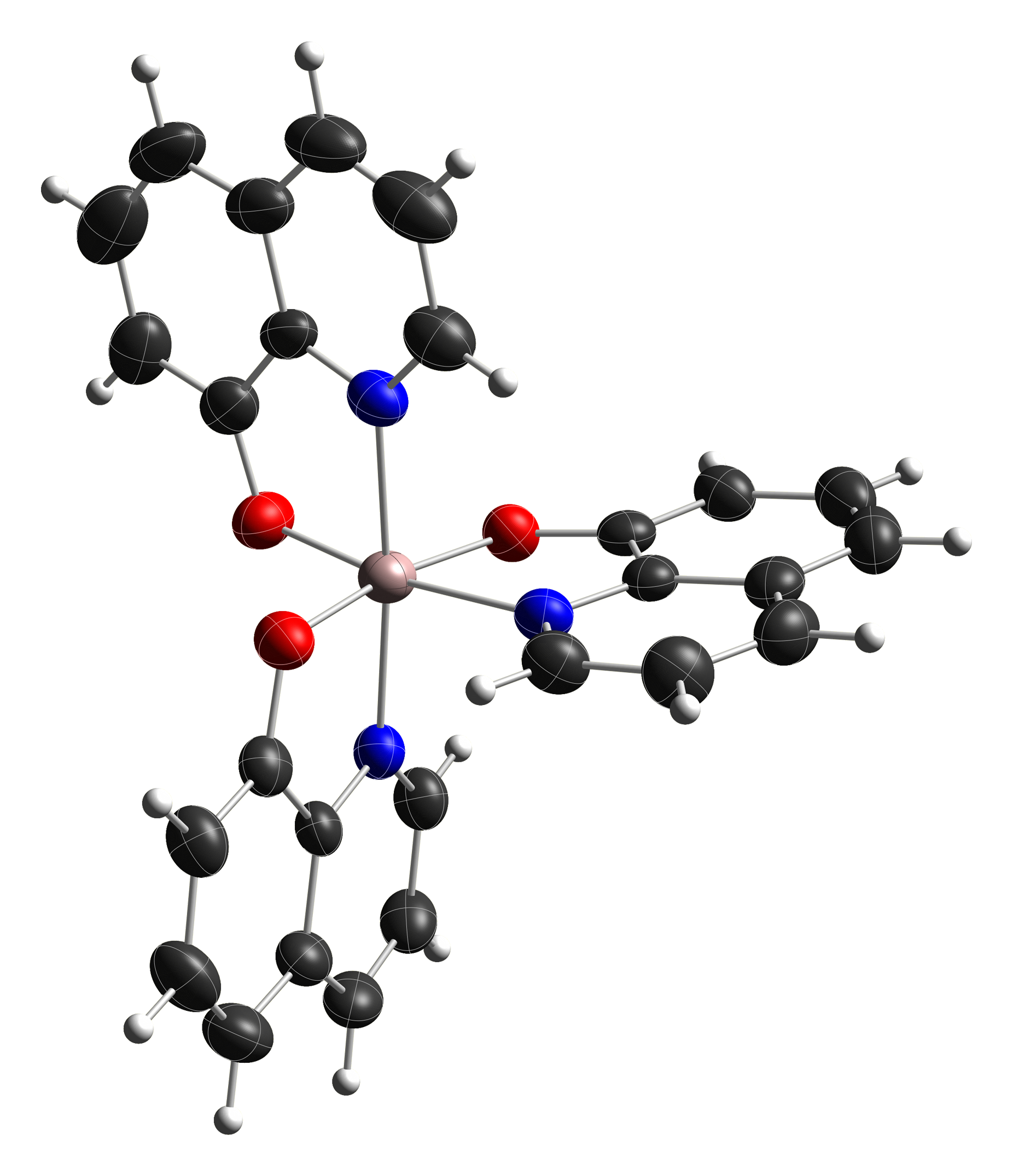
Tris(8-hydroxyquinolinato)aluminium

The aluminium complex, is a common component of organic light-emitting diodes (OLEDs). Substituents on the quinoline ring affect the luminescence properties.

In its photo-induced excited-state, 8-hydroxyquinoline converts to zwitterionic isomers, in which the hydrogen atom is transferred from oxygen to nitrogen.

== History ==
8-hydroxyquinoline was first obtained by Hugo Weidel and his student Albert Cobenzl in 1880. They decarboxylated so-called oxycinchoninic acid (from cinchonine) and characterized the resulting compound as melting at about 70°C. They identified that the hydroxy group is on the benzene ring (but not its particular place) and called the compound oxyquinoline and α-quinophenol.

In the following year more chemists found other ways to make the compound. Zdenko Hans Skraup discovered a way to synthesize substituted quinolines from substituted phenols and described three isomers of oxyquinoline, identifying the structure of 8-hydroxyquinoline. Otto Fischer and his student Karl Bedall made the compound from a sulphonic acid independently at about the same time, but misidentified its structure.

By 1888 azo dyes were made from the compound.

In the 1920s insoluble chelates of 8-hydroxyquinoline were discovered.

== Bioactivity ==
The complexes as well as the heterocycle itself exhibit antiseptic, disinfectant, and pesticide properties, functioning as a transcription inhibitor. Its solution in alcohol is used in liquid bandages. It once was of interest as an anti-cancer drug.

A thiol analogue, 8-mercaptoquinoline is also known.

The roots of the invasive plant Centaurea diffusa release 8-hydroxyquinoline, which has a negative effect on plants that have not co-evolved with it.

== Applications ==
Here is a list of compounds that are made from 8-hydroxyquinoline: nitroxoline, VK-28, VAR10303, cloxyquin chloroxine, 5F-PB-22, PB-22, M30, iodoquinol, broxyquinoline, chiniofon, clioquinol, quinterenol, PBT2 & clamoxyquine for example.

== See also ==
- Ionophore
- Trace metal detection test
