= Enniatin =

Group of chemical compounds

Enniatin B

Names
- IUPAC name (3S,6R,9S,12R,15S,18R)-4,10,16-trimethyl-3,6,9,12,15,18-hexa(propan-2-yl)-1,7,13-trioxa-4,10,16-triazacyclooctadecane-2,5,8,11,14,17-hexone

Identifiers
CAS Number	917-13-5
ChEMBL	ChEMBLCHEMBL469036
ChemSpider	144430
KEGG	C15740
PubChem CID	164754
UNII	H02S2TZR95

Properties
Chemical formula	C_{33}H_{57}N_{3}O_{9}
Molar mass	639.831 g·mol^{−1}
Appearance	White, crystalline powder
Melting point	173–175 °C (343–347 °F; 446–448 K)
Solubility in water	Insoluble in water

Hazards
- GHS labelling
Pictograms	(GHS06: Toxic)
Hazard statements	H301, H311, H331
Precautionary statements	P261, P262, P264, P270, P271, P280, P301+P316, P302+P352, P304+P340, P316, P321, P330, P361+P364, P403+P233, P405, P501
- Except where otherwise noted, data are given for materials in their standard state (at 25 °C [77 °F], 100 kPa). Infobox references

Chemical structure of enniatin A

Enniatins are a class of organic chemical compounds found in Fusarium fungi. They appear in nature as mixtures of cyclic depsipeptides. The main variants are enniatin A, A1, B and B1 together with minor amounts of enniatin C, D, E and F.

The enniatins act as ionophores that bind ammonium, and they have been proposed as replacements for nonactin in specific ammonium-based electrodes.

Enniatins have been also mentioned as potential anti-AIDS drugs.

== Enniatin B (ENN B) ==
The mycotoxin Enniatin B is produced by Fusarium fungi strains, which are considered common pathogens of cereal grains, this includes feed stock as well as human supplies. A major concern here is that the chemical structure of these toxins does not get changed by common food processing techniques like boiling.

It is part of the group of the Enniatins, which encompasses, for example A, A1, B and B1 and has structural similarity to beauvericins, which also exhibit ionophore structures.

Enniatin B has been used as a drug due to its antibiotic and anti-inflammatory properties under the name of Fusafungine. Nowadays, it is still investigated because of its human beneficial effects like possible anti-cancerogenic functioning.

== History ==
In 1947, Gäumann et al. found that out of the ether extract of the Fusarium fungi a crystalline, colorless substance with a melting point of 121-122°C has interesting properties, next to its toxicity. It has shown antibiotic activity, specifically towards various strains of mycobacteria. Anti-cancerogenic properties are still investigated. More recent developments are dealing with mycotoxins posing a serious concern for health for both animals and humans.

== Structure and reactivity ==
=== ENN B ===
Structure of Enniatin B

Enniatin B is a symmetrical molecule with three N-methyl- L-valine and three a-hydroxy-D-isovaleric components. This structure leads to diamerization and thus generation of ionophores, which can transport ions across membranes, specifically influencing mitochondrial functioning.

IUPAC name: (3S,6R,9S,12R,15S,18R)-4,10,16-trimethyl-3,6,9,12,15,18-hexa(propan-2-yl)-1,7,13-trioxa-4,10,16-triazacyclooctadecane-2,5,8,11,14,17-hexone.

== Synthesis ==
=== ENN B ===
Previous synthesis of Enniatin B included PCl_{5} and HBr-mediated or utilizing Mitsanobu reactions, which forms an ester from an alcohol, with a following silver-mediated amide trimethylation.

Due to precipitation in the reaction sequences, another mode of synthesis of (−)-enniatin B from (2R)-2-hydroxy-3-methylbutanoic acid was proposed. These nine steps, which have been described to achieve a 15% yield, promise better suitability regarding precipitates and simpler intermediate purification steps.

Step (a) encompasses reacting the acid (8) with the alcohol (7) with reagents EDCI and DMAP (4-dimethylaminopyridine, 1.3 equivalents) and dichloromethane 82%. DMAP is useful for reducing anhydride formation.

The resulting depsipeptidate is reacted to achieve hydrogenolysis and acid-catalyzed deprotection with (b) H_{2}, Pd/C, EtOAc (100%) and (c) 4 M HCl/1,4-dioxane (100%), respectively, which is yielding an acid (10) and amine salt (11).

These are coupled with the (d) Ghosez's reagent (1-chloro-N,N,2-trimethyl-1-propenylamine) and DIPEA (diisopropylethylamine) with dichloromethane.

On this coupled compound, tetradepsipeptide, hydrogenolysis and another coupling to a second equivalent of amine salt 11 was performed to provide hexadepsipeptide (13) with the reagents (e) H2, Pd/C, EtOAc (100%) and (f) Ghosez's reagent, DIPEA and dichloromethane.

Hexapesipeptide (13) can be deprotected by hydrogenolysis as in (g) H2, Pd/C, EtOAc (88%) and acidification with (h) 4 M HCl/1,4-dioxane including vacuum and the resulting amino acid HCl salt can be cyclized utilizing (i) Ghosez's reagent DIPEA and dichloromethane.

== Biosynthesis ==
=== ENN B ===
The biosynthesis of Enniatin B is catalyzed by the 347 kDa multienzyme enniatin synthase (ESYN1), which has been purified from Fusarium oxysporum. It consists of two substrate activation modules EA and EB, which binds the hydroxy acids or activates the amino acids, respectively.

== Available forms and exposure ==
=== ENN B ===
ENN B was available in the form of a medicine (called Fusafungine) given its bacteriostatic and anti-inflammatory properties. Given these properties ENN B, in a mixture of other enniatin's, was used as a local antibiotic to treat upper respiratory tract infections. The medicine was used as a topical treatment and would be administered orally or nasally. While it was first authorised for use in the EU market in 1963, it has since been withdrawn in 2016 given an increasing rate of rare but severe allergic reactions. Furthermore, there was a lack of evidence on Fusafungines efficacy and effectiveness in treatment and a potential risk of promoting antimicrobial resistance which further implicated its removal from the market.

ENN B is also present as a major emerging contaminant in food crops. ENN B has been found to contaminate maize, wheat, barley, and rice. A study investigating the dietary exposure of ENN B argued that the occurrence on cereal crops was close to 100% globally with a range of 6 to 269 µg/kg based on a sample of 347 cereal based products with children aged one to nine being the most exposed. Given the lack of toxicological data on ENN B no formal risk assessment has been done; however, there are concerns about the side effects of a chronic low dose dietary exposure to ENN B.

== Mechanism of action ==
=== ENN B ===
ENN B acts as a lipophilic ionophore due to its amphiphilic ring structure. The hydrophobic region within the structure allows ENN B to intercalate into membrane lipid bilayers and bind to cations, such as K+, Na+, and Ca2+. The formed ENN B-cation complex acts as a transmembrane channel, through which cations get transported in and out of membranes. This leads to uncontrolled cation flow that disrupts the normal ion gradient and membrane potential.

The main mechanism by which ENN B exerts its cytotoxic effects is mitochondrial toxicity.

=== Mitochondrial toxicity ===
The membrane potential and proton gradient of the mitochondrial matrix are normally highly negative, but ENN B partially neutralizes this charge by facilitating K+ transport into the mitochondria matrix. This prevents the electron motive force from stimulating the ATP synthase, resulting in an ionic imbalance that causes mitochondrial swelling and that promotes cell death.

== Metabolism ==
=== ENN B ===
Enniatin B is primarily metabolized in the liver by phase I cytochrome P450 enzymes, with little evidence of phase II conjugation. Ivanova et al. demonstrated this in an in vitro study using rat, dog, and human liver microsomes. With the use of selective chemical inhibitors, they determined that CYP3A, CYP1A2 and CYP2C19 are involved in the metabolism in humans, with CYP3A contributing the most, as its inhibition reduced metabolite formation by 80%. In rats and dogs, the metabolism was mainly carried out by CYP3A and CYP1A isoforms.

=== Metabolites ===
From liver microsome incubations, 12 phase I metabolites of ENN B were identified. These were grouped based on similar characteristics:

- Monohydroxylated metabolites (M1 - M5): formed by the addition of a hydroxyl group at different positions of the ENN B molecule.
- N‑demethylated metabolites (M6 - M7): formed from removal of methyl groups from N‑methylated amino acids in the cyclic peptide.
- Multi-oxidation products (M8 - M12): formed from multiple oxidative transformations like hydroxylation and N‑demethylation.

Recent in vitro studies using human and mouse liver microsomes and HepaRG cell models also identified 13 similar putative phase I metabolites of ENN B, also formed from oxidation, demethylation, hydration and desaturation.

== Uses and purposes ==
=== ENN B ===
While being researched as a major emerging contaminant in food crops Enniatin B (ENN B) has other uses such as by an antibacterial, antifungal, herbicidal and insecticidal compound. Recent studies preliminarily suggest ENN B to have anti-cancer properties by using it to help overcome drug resistance. ENN B has shown promise as an antibacterial against human diseases by inhibiting the growth of microorganisms while having little significant toxic effect on Caco-2 cells. Given that Caco-2 cells are used to model the human intestinal barrier having little cytotoxic effect, it could be an option as an antibacterial for humans. However, there is a wealth of evidence conflicting this claim with findings such as ENN B being toxic even at low doses to human nucleated cells.

== Side effects ==
=== ENN B ===
Given that ENN B has been found on a contaminate of major crops exposure through diet likely. The European Food Safety Authority has stated that acute exposure does not have any concern to human health, however, issues may arise in the chronic low-dose exposure of ENN B given that it is prevalent in staple foods of the human and animal diet. Furthermore, given ENN B is lipophilic, it may be able to bioaccumulate and enter the food chain through meat, milk and eggs. This may lead to increased exposure and therefore risks of side effects.

There is a lack of studies in vivo on the long-term side effects of ENN B on human health. However, In vitro studies have showed a range of toxicological effects such as cytotoxicity, oxidative stress, cell cycle disruption, mitochondrial membrane potential disruption, endocrine disruption, apoptosis and necrosis. These effects are largely attributed to the ionophoroic nature of ENN B.

In vivo studies that have been done on Broiler chicken (dose - 0.2 mg/kg of body weight) and mice (dose – 5 mg/kg of body weight) showed tissue bioaccumulation of ENN B but few other side effects. However, at higher doses (10-40 mg/kg of body wight) ENN B was fatal to mice.

Extrapolating from in vitro and animal in vivo studies and similar mycotoxins to ENN B, it may have the potential to cause organ damage particularly to tissues with high metabolic turn-over such as the liver, act as an immunomodulator and endocrine disruptor. However, given the lack of in vivo studies in humans no firm conclusion for its danger to human health and confirmed side effects has been drawn yet and research on the toxicology effect on ENN B are ongoing. Furthermore, there are complications when investigating the concerns of ENN B due to the co-occurrence with other mycotoxins such as Deoxynivalenol (DON) that may cause a synergistic effect worsening potential side effects.

== Indicators/Biomarkers ==
=== ENN B ===
Biomarkers help determine the connection between human exposure to ENN B and its influence on health as it shows the actual quantity of ENN B that has been bio-transformed by the organism. Biomarkers for the indication of exposure to ENN B, and mycotoxins in general, are usually found by detecting the metabolites of the mycotoxin in the urine. In humans, mono-oxygenated, N-demethylated and di-oxygenated species are the predominant ENN B metabolites. Blood, breast milk and hair can also be used for biomarker analysis, but urine is typically used as its easier to obtain. Additionally, given ENN Bs lipophilicity it has been found to accumulate in tissues like the liver, fatty tissues and lungs and can be detected in these organs as well.

== Toxicology ==
=== ENN B ===
The specific toxicokinetic and toxicological effects due to exposure to Enniatin B have not been expressly researched in living humans. However, there is extensive information regarding in vivo applications in mice or rodents and in vitro exposure to human cells. Enniatin B exposure typically occurs via oral ingestion, due to its existence in food, such as fungi, nuts and legumes.

In vivo experiments, orally administrating varying doses of Enniatin B over a 2-day period in both male and female mice, concluded there was a cytotoxic effect at 50, 100 and 200mg/kg body weight doses, characterised by centrilobular swelling of the liver. Additionally, dose-dependent increase of DNA migration was observed in both the bone marrow and liver also at 50, 100 and 200mg/kg bodyweight indicating potential genotoxic nature of ENNB.

In vitro exposure of human cell cultures to a family of Enniatin compounds showed that it affects HepG2 liver cells, more than other human cell types such as intestinal Caco-2. 50% of these HepG2 cells displayed cytotoxic behaviour at the lowest effective dose of 1μM highlighting its hepatoxic nature.

Enniatin B has effects on the genes encoding the mitochondrial complex I, downregulating them and inhibiting the oxidative phosphorylation overall reducing the energy output of cells. Additionally, stimulation of reactive oxygen species increases the oxidative stress on affected cells. In tandem with the inhibited mitochondrial activity this eventually leading to apoptotic cell death.

Whilst there is currently no occupational exposure limits set on Enniatin B due to the lack of information on its toxicity, there have been assessments done on average exposure for differing age groups in Europe shown in table 1.

Age Group	Mean Exposure per Day (ng/kg b.w.)
Infants (0-11 months)	420 – 650
Toddlers (12-35 months)	1130 – 1820
Children (3-9 years)	870 – 1800
Adolescents (10-17 years)	550 – 1070
Adults (18-60 years)	470 – 1560
Elderly (60-69 years)	610 – 1710
Very Elderly (>70 years)	660 – 1500

Table 1: The mean average exposure per day in nanograms per kilogram of body weight for all age groups.

== See also ==
- Beauvericin
- Fusafungine
