= PDTC =

PDTC may refer to:

- Pyrrolidine dithiocarbamate
- 2,6-Pyridinedicarbothioic acid
