= Cortin =

Cortin may refer to:

- Cortin, a synonym for corticosteroid
- Cortin, a trade name for the antifungal drug clioquinol
