= Streptomyces griseiniger =

Scientific classification
- Domain: Bacteria
- Kingdom: Bacillati
- Phylum: Actinomycetota
- Class: Actinomycetes
- Order: Streptomycetales
- Family: Streptomycetaceae
- Genus: Streptomyces
- Species: S. griseiniger

Binomial name
- Streptomyces griseiniger Goodfellow et al. 2008

Type strain
- DSM 41895, NCIMB 9628, NRRL B-1865, PSA 77

Species of bacterium

Streptomyces griseiniger is a bacterium species from the genus of Streptomyces which has been isolated in Australia. Streptomyces griseiniger produces nigericin.

== See also ==
- List of Streptomyces species
