= Mycotoxin =

Toxin produced by a fungus

A mycotoxin (from the Greek μύκης mykes, "fungus" and τοξικός toxikos, "poisonous") is a toxic secondary metabolite produced by fungi and is capable of causing disease and death in both humans and other animals. The term 'mycotoxin' is usually reserved for the toxic chemical products produced by fungi that readily colonize crops.

Examples of mycotoxins causing human and animal illness include aflatoxin, citrinin, fumonisins, ochratoxin A, patulin, trichothecenes, zearalenone, and ergot alkaloids such as ergotamine.

One mold species may produce many different mycotoxins, and several species may produce the same mycotoxin.

== Production ==
Most fungi are aerobic (use oxygen) and are found almost everywhere in extremely small quantities due to the diminutive size of their spores. They consume organic matter wherever humidity and temperature are sufficient. Where conditions are right, fungi proliferate into colonies and mycotoxin levels become high. The reason for the production of mycotoxins is not yet known; they are not necessary for the growth or the development of the fungi. Because mycotoxins weaken the receiving host, they may improve the environment for further fungal proliferation. The production of toxins depends on the surrounding intrinsic and extrinsic environments and these substances vary greatly in their toxicity, depending on the organism infected and its susceptibility, metabolism, and defense mechanisms.

== Major groups ==
Aflatoxins are a type of mycotoxin produced by Aspergillus species of fungi, such as A. flavus and A. parasiticus. The umbrella term aflatoxin refers to four different types of mycotoxins produced, which are B_{1}, B_{2}, G_{1}, and G_{2}. Aflatoxin B_{1}, the most toxic, is a potent carcinogen and has been directly correlated to adverse health effects, such as liver cancer, in many animal species. Aflatoxins are largely associated with commodities produced in the tropics and subtropics, such as cotton, peanuts, spices, pistachios, and maize. According to the USDA, "They are probably the best known and most intensively researched mycotoxins in the world."

Ochratoxin is a mycotoxin that comes in three secondary metabolite forms, A, B, and C. All are produced by Penicillium and Aspergillus species. The three forms differ in that Ochratoxin B (OTB) is a nonchlorinated form of Ochratoxin A (OTA) and that Ochratoxin C (OTC) is an ethyl ester form of Ochratoxin A. Aspergillus ochraceus is found as a contaminant of a wide range of commodities including beverages such as beer and wine. Aspergillus carbonarius is the main species found on vine fruit, which releases its toxin during the juice making process. OTA has been labeled as a carcinogen and a nephrotoxin, and has been linked to tumors in the human urinary tract, although research in humans is limited by confounding factors.

Citrinin is a toxin that was first isolated from Penicillium citrinum, but has been identified in over a dozen species of Penicillium and several species of Aspergillus. Some of these species are used to produce human foodstuffs such as cheese (Penicillium camemberti), sake, miso, and soy sauce (Aspergillus oryzae). Citrinin is associated with yellowed rice disease in Japan and acts as a nephrotoxin in all animal species tested. Although it is associated with many human foods (wheat, rice, corn, barley, oats, rye, and food colored with Monascus pigment) its full significance for human health is unknown. Citrinin can also act synergistically with Ochratoxin A to depress RNA synthesis in murine kidneys.

Ergot alkaloids are compounds produced as a toxic mixture of alkaloids in the sclerotia of species of Claviceps, which are common pathogens of various grass species. The ingestion of ergot sclerotia from infected cereals, commonly in the form of bread produced from contaminated flour, causes ergotism, the human disease historically known as St. Anthony's Fire. There are two forms of ergotism: gangrenous, affecting blood supply to extremities, and convulsive, affecting the central nervous system. Modern methods of grain cleaning have significantly reduced ergotism as a human disease; however, it is still an important veterinary problem. Ergot alkaloids have been used pharmaceutically.

Patulin is a toxin produced by the P. expansum, Aspergillus, Penicillium, and Paecilomyces fungal species. P. expansum is especially associated with a range of moldy fruits and vegetables, in particular rotting apples and figs. It is destroyed by the fermentation process and so is not found in apple beverages, such as cider. Although patulin has not been shown to be carcinogenic, it has been reported to damage the immune system in animals. In 2004, the European Community set limits to the concentrations of patulin in food products. They currently stand at 50 μg/kg in all fruit juice concentrations, at 25 μg/kg in solid apple products used for direct consumption, and at 10 μg/kg for children's apple products, including apple juice.

Fusarium toxins are produced by over 50 species of Fusarium and have a history of infecting the grain of developing cereals such as wheat and maize. They include a range of mycotoxins, such as: the fumonisins, which affect the nervous systems of horses and may cause cancer in rodents; the trichothecenes, which are most strongly associated with chronic and fatal toxic effects in animals and humans; and zearalenone, which is not correlated to any fatal toxic effects in animals or humans. Some of the other major types of Fusarium toxins include: enniatins such as beauvericin), butenolide, equisetin, and fusarins.

== Occurrence ==
Although various wild mushrooms contain an assortment of poisons that are definitely fungal metabolites causing noteworthy health problems for humans, they are rather arbitrarily excluded from discussions of mycotoxicology. In such cases the distinction is based on the size of the producing fungus and human intention. Mycotoxin exposure is almost always accidental whereas with mushrooms improper identification and ingestion causing mushroom poisoning is commonly the case. Ingestion of misidentified mushrooms containing mycotoxins may result in hallucinations. The cyclopeptide-producing Amanita phalloides is well known for its toxic potential and is responsible for approximately 90% of all mushroom fatalities. The other primary mycotoxin groups found in mushrooms include: orellanine, monomethylhydrazine, disulfiram-like, hallucinogenic indoles, muscarinic, isoxazole, and gastrointestinal (GI)-specific irritants. The bulk of this article is about mycotoxins that are found in microfungi other than poisons from mushrooms or macroscopic fungi.

=== In indoor environments ===
Buildings are another source of mycotoxins and people living or working in areas with mold increase their chances of adverse health effects. Molds growing in buildings can be divided into three groups – primary, secondary, and tertiary colonizers. Each group is categorized by the ability to grow at a certain water activity requirement. It has become difficult to identify mycotoxin production by indoor molds for many variables, such as (i) they may be masked as derivatives, (ii) they are poorly documented, and (iii) the fact that they are likely to produce different metabolites on building materials. Some of the mycotoxins in the indoor environment are produced by Alternaria, Aspergillus (multiple forms), Penicillium, and Stachybotrys. Stachybotrys chartarum contains a higher number of mycotoxins than other molds grown in the indoor environment and has been associated with allergies and respiratory inflammation. The infestation of S. chartarum in buildings containing gypsum board, as well as on ceiling tiles, is very common and has recently become a more recognized problem. When gypsum board has been repeatedly introduced to moisture, S. chartarum grows readily on its cellulose face. This stresses the importance of moisture controls and ventilation within residential homes and other buildings. The negative health effects of mycotoxins are a function of the concentration, the duration of exposure, and the subject's sensitivities. The concentrations experienced in a normal home, office, or school are often too low to trigger a health response in occupants.

In the 1990s, public concern over mycotoxins increased following multimillion-dollar toxic mold settlements. The lawsuits took place after a study by the Center for Disease Control (CDC) in Cleveland, Ohio, reported an association between mycotoxins from Stachybotrys spores and pulmonary hemorrhage in infants. However, in 2000, based on internal and external reviews of their data, the CDC concluded that because of flaws in their methods, the association was not proven. Stachybotrys spores in animal studies have been shown to cause lung hemorrhaging, but only at very high concentrations.

One study by the Center of Integrative Toxicology at Michigan State University investigated the causes of Damp Building Related Illness (DBRI). They found that Stachybotrys is possibly an important contributing factor to DBRI. So far animal models indicate that airway exposure to S. chartarum can evoke allergic sensitization, inflammation, and cytotoxicity in the upper and lower respiratory tracts. Trichothecene toxicity appears to be an underlying cause of many of these adverse effects. Recent findings indicate that lower doses (studies usually involve high doses) can cause these symptoms.

Some toxicologists have used the Concentration of No Toxicological Concern (CoNTC) measure to represent the airborne concentration of mycotoxins that are expected to cause no hazard to humans (exposed continuously throughout a 70–yr lifetime). The resulting data of several studies have thus far demonstrated that common exposures to airborne mycotoxins in the built indoor environment are below the CoNTC, however agricultural environments have potential to produce levels greater than the CoNTC.

=== In food ===
Mycotoxins can appear in the food chain as a result of fungal infection of crops, either by being eaten directly by humans or by being used as livestock feed.

In 2004 in Kenya, 125 people died and nearly 200 others required medical treatment after eating aflatoxin-contaminated maize. The deaths were mainly associated with homegrown maize that had not been treated with fungicides or properly dried before storage. Due to food shortages at the time, farmers may have been harvesting maize earlier than normal to prevent thefts from their fields, so that the grain had not fully matured and was more susceptible to infection.

Spices are susceptible substrate for growth of mycotoxigenic fungi and mycotoxin production. Red chilli, black pepper, and dry ginger were found to be the most contaminated spices.

Physical methods to prevent growth of mycotoxin‐producing fungi or remove toxins from contaminated food include temperature and humidity control, irradiation and photodynamic treatment. Mycotoxins can also be removed chemically and biologically using antifungal/anti‐mycotoxins agents and antifungal plant metabolites.

=== In animal food ===
Dimorphic fungi, which include Blastomyces dermatitidis and Paracoccidioides brasiliensis, are known causative agents of endemic systemic mycoses.

There were outbreaks of dog food containing aflatoxin in North America in late 2005 and early 2006, and again in late 2011.

Mycotoxins in animal fodder, particularly silage, can decrease the performance of farm animals and potentially kill them. Several mycotoxins reduce milk yield when ingested by dairy cattle.

=== In dietary supplements ===
Contamination of medicinal plants with mycotoxins can contribute to adverse human health problems and therefore represents a special hazard. Numerous natural occurrences of mycotoxins in medicinal plants and herbal medicines have been reported from various countries including Spain, China, Germany, India, Turkey and from the Middle East. In a 2015 analysis of plant-based dietary supplements, the highest mycotoxin concentrations were found in milk thistle-based supplements, at up to 37 mg/kg.

== Health effects ==
Some of the health effects found in animals and humans include death, identifiable diseases or health problems, weakened immune systems without specificity to a toxin, and as allergens or irritants. Some mycotoxins are harmful to other micro-organisms such as other fungi or even bacteria; penicillin is one example. It has been suggested that mycotoxins in stored animal feed are the cause of rare phenotypical sex changes in hens that causes them to look and act male. Mycotoxins impact on health may be "very hard" and can be categorized in three forms "as mutagenic, carcinogenic, and genotoxic".

=== In humans ===
Mycotoxicosis is the term used for poisoning associated with exposures to mycotoxins. Mycotoxins have the potential for both acute and chronic health effects via ingestion, skin contact, inhalation, and entering the blood stream and lymphatic system. They inhibit protein synthesis, damage macrophage systems, inhibit particle clearance of the lung, and increase sensitivity to bacterial endotoxin. Testing for mycotoxicosis can be conducted using immunoaffinity columns.

The symptoms of mycotoxicosis depend on the type of mycotoxin; the concentration and length of exposure; as well as age, health, and sex of the exposed individual. The synergistic effects associated with several other factors such as genetics, diet, and interactions with other toxins have been poorly studied. Therefore, it is possible that vitamin deficiency, caloric deprivation, excessive alcohol use, and infectious disease status can all have compounded effects with mycotoxins.

== Mitigation ==
Mycotoxins greatly resist decomposition or being broken down in digestion, so they remain in the food chain in meat and dairy products. Even temperature treatments, such as cooking and freezing, do not destroy some mycotoxins.

=== Removal ===
In the feed and food industry, it has become common practice to add mycotoxin binding agents such as montmorillonite or bentonite clay in order to effectively adsorb the mycotoxins. To reverse the adverse effects of mycotoxins, the following criteria are used to evaluate the functionality of any binding additive:

- Efficacy of active component verified by scientific data
- A low effective inclusion rate
- Stability over a wide pH range
- High capacity to absorb high concentrations of mycotoxins
- High affinity to absorb low concentrations of mycotoxins
- Affirmation of chemical interaction between mycotoxin and adsorbent
- Proven in vivo data with all major mycotoxins
- Non-toxic, environmentally friendly component

Since not all mycotoxins can be bound to such agents, the latest approach to mycotoxin control is mycotoxin deactivation. By means of enzymes (esterase, de-epoxidase), yeast (Trichosporon mycotoxinvorans), or bacterial strains (Eubacterium BBSH 797 developed by Biomin), mycotoxins can be reduced during pre-harvesting contamination. Other removal methods include physical separation, washing, milling, nixtamalization, heat-treatment, radiation, extraction with solvents, and the use of chemical or biological agents. Irradiation methods have proven to be effective treatment against mold growth and toxin production.

=== Regulations ===
Many international agencies are trying to achieve universal standardization of regulatory limits for mycotoxins. Currently, over 100 countries have regulations regarding mycotoxins in the feed industry, in which 13 mycotoxins or groups of mycotoxins are of concern. The process of assessing a regulated mycotoxin involves a wide array of in-laboratory testing that includes extracting, clean-up columns, and separation techniques. Most official regulations and control methods are based on high-performance liquid techniques (e.g., HPLC) through international bodies. It is implied that any regulations regarding these toxins will be in co-ordinance with any other countries with which a trade agreement exists. Many of the standards for the method performance analysis for mycotoxins is set by the European Committee for Standardization (CEN). However, one must take note that scientific risk assessment is commonly influenced by culture and politics, which, in turn, will affect trade regulations of mycotoxins.

Food-based mycotoxins were studied extensively worldwide throughout the 20th century. In Europe, statutory levels of a range of mycotoxins permitted in food and animal feed are set by a range of European directives and EC regulations. The U.S. Food and Drug Administration (FDA) has regulated and enforced limits on concentrations of mycotoxins in foods and feed industries since 1985. It is through various compliance programs that the FDA monitors these industries to guarantee that mycotoxins are kept at a practical level. These compliance programs sample food products including peanuts and peanut products, tree nuts, corn and corn products, cottonseed, and milk. There is still a lack of sufficient surveillance data on some mycotoxins that occur in the U.S.

== See also ==
- Mold growth, assessment, and remediation
