= Morizo Ishidate =

Japanese pharmacist (1901–1996)

- 石館守三
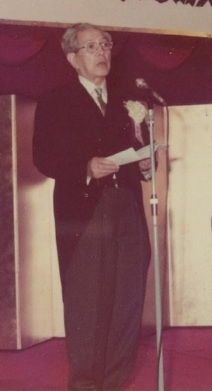
- Morizo Ishidate, 1974
- Born: January 24, 1901; Aomori City, Aomori Prefecture, Japan
- Died: July 18, 1996 (aged 95); Suginami, Tokyo
- Occupation: Pharmacist
- Spouse: Hiroko Kurata
- Children: Moto and Kozo

Morizo Ishidate (石館守三) (January 24, 1901 – July 18, 1996) was a Japanese doctor of pharmacy who served as the 16th Director General of Japan's National Institute of Health Sciences (NIHS), and a pioneer in treating leprosy. The Federation of Asian Pharmaceutical Associations (FAPA) named the FAPA Ishidate Award in his honor for his contributions to the field of pharmacy.

== Personal life ==
Ishidate was born January 24, 1901, in Aomori City, Aomori Prefecture, the third son of his family. Ishidate has an early memory of visiting a leprosy sanatorium in Japan's Tōhoku region, near his hometown. He was first exposed to Christianity by a female American missionary while attending Tokyo Imperial University, now University of Tokyo. His best college friend was Yoshinosuke Konishi, who became a Christian evangelist in September 1947. Ishidate supported his friend for 33 years. Ishidate confessed his belief in Jesus in 1970. He died on July 18, 1996, in the Suginami district of Tokyo.

== Career ==
Ishidate published three studies on how camphor affects a human heart. For this work with camphor, Ishidate was awarded the Imperial Academy Prize by the Japan Academy on May 13, 1943. Ishidate synthesized promin in 1946 based on a short news item from a Swiss journal smuggled into Japan during World War II.

In 1960, while a professor of pharmacy at the University of Tokyo, he was a co-founder of the Tokyo Biochemical Research Foundation, now the Chugai Foundation for Innovative Drug Discovery Science. Ishidate was the first Dean of the Faculty of Pharmaceutical Sciences at the University of Tokyo. While leading NIHS, he began implementing many reforms in 1966.

An epidemic of subacute myelo-optic neuropathy (SMON) began in Japan in the early 1960s. In September 1970 as president of the Central Pharmaceutical Affairs Council, Ishidate ordered a stop to the use of clioquinol, marketed as quinoform, because he had correctly deduced that SMON was caused by clioquinol intoxication.

In 1973 he implemented the separation of dispensing and prescribing of pharmaceuticals in Japan. In 1974 he was a co-founder of the Sasakawa Memorial Health Foundation, now Sasakawa Health Foundation, which is dedicated to eradicating leprosy around the world. By that time, Ishidate was already noted for being a pioneer in treating leprosy with chemotherapy in Japan, especially for synthesizing promin, used for treating leprosy and other diseases.
