= PBT2 =

Names
- Preferred IUPAC name 5,7-Dichloro-2-[(dimethylamino)methyl]quinolin-8-ol

Identifiers
CAS Number	747408-78-2
3D model (JSmol)	Interactive image
ChemSpider	8191585
PubChem CID	10016012
UNII	Q7K6GJQ4O4
CompTox Dashboard (EPA)	DTXSID701029571
- InChI: InChI=1S/C12H12Cl2N2O/c1-16(2)6-7-3-4-8-9(13)5-10(14)12(17)11(8)15-7/h3-5,17H,6H2,1-2H3 Key: YZPOQCQXOSEMAZ-UHFFFAOYSA-N
- SMILES: CN(C)CC1=NC2=C(C=C1)C(=CC(=C2O)Cl)Cl

Properties
Chemical formula	C_{12}H_{12}Cl_{2}N_{2}O
Molar mass	271.14 g·mol^{−1}
- Except where otherwise noted, data are given for materials in their standard state (at 25 °C [77 °F], 100 kPa). Infobox references

PBT2 is a safe-for-human-use Zinc ionophore and an experimental drug candidate. It is a second-generation 8-hydroxyquinoline analog intended to be a successor to clioquinol and a potential treatment of Alzheimer's disease and Huntington's disease.

== Clinical trials ==
PBT2 was the subject of three phase II clinical trials for Alzheimer's disease ("EURO", "IMAGINE" and "IMAGINE EXTENSION") and one for Huntington's disease ("REACH2HD").

The cognition efficacy results for Alzheimer's disease were mixed. The EURO trial showed some improvements in cognitive functions, in particular executive function domains, while the IMAGINE study did not. Although there is no evidence that PBT2 is of any benefit in Alzheimer's dementia, the number of subjects treated with PBT2 for AD in Phase II placebo controlled trials (N~76) is limited and the trials were not powered to detect cognitive outcomes. In the Phase II PBT2 trial in Huntington disease, whilst the overall cognitive composite measured was not improved, an executive function domain within the composite was significantly improved.

=== Phase II studies in AD ===
PBT2-201 (EURO) was a 12-week randomized, double-blind, placebo-controlled, parallel three-group study (Phase II) to assess the safety, tolerability and efficacy of two dose levels of PBT2 to slow progression of disease in patients with early AD. Seventy-eight (78) patients were enrolled and all were evaluated for safety and efficacy. PBT2 treatment of 50 and 250 mg a day was well tolerated in patients with AD during 12 weeks of treatment, with some evidence that the PBT2 250 mg/day dose can modulate certain biomarkers associated with AD, notably a significant decrease in CSF Abeta levels, and improvement in aspects of cognitive function as measured by the Executive Function composite z score and the individual Trails Making Test (TMT) Part B and the Category Fluency tests.

PBT2-204 (IMAGINE) was a 12-month brain amyloid imaging study in which patients with mild AD (n=42) were administered PBT2 250 mg or placebo. Forty-two (42) patients were enrolled and all were evaluated for safety and efficacy. PBT2 was shown to be safe and very well tolerated over the 52 weeks, with the adverse event profile equivalent between placebo and treated groups. There was no difference in brain amyloid levels between the PBT2- and placebo-treated groups as measured by PiB.

PBT2-204-Ext (Extension) Thirty-three (n=33) patients continued on 250 mg PBT2 in an open-label extension study and were evaluated for safety and efficacy, with n=27 patients completing the study. The safety findings indicate that longer-term treatment (up to 104 weeks) with PBT2 250 mg was well tolerated in patients with prodromal or mild AD. The safety findings from this study are consistent with those that would be expected in a population of elderly adults with prodromal or mild AD.

=== Phase II study in HD ===
PBT2-203 (Reach2HD) was a 6-month safety, tolerability and efficacy study in HD. Patients with early to mid-stage HD (n=109) received PBT2 100 mg, PBT2 250 mg or placebo once daily. The primary objective of the study was to evaluate the safety and tolerability of two dose levels of PBT2 (100 mg and 250 mg, once daily) compared to Placebo after 26 weeks in participants with early to mid-stage HD. PBT2 was shown to be safe and well tolerated over the 26 weeks, with the adverse event profile equivalent between placebo and PBT2 groups.

The secondary objectives of the study focused on the specific symptoms or manifestations of HD. The primary efficacy objective of the study was to determine the effect of PBT2 on cognition as measured by a cognitive test battery consisting of Category Fluency Test, TMT Parts A and B, Map Search, Symbol Digit Modalities Test, Stroop Word Reading Test, Speeded Tapping Task and MoCA. The results of these assessments were used to calculate three composite z-scores of cognition – the Main Composite z-score, Exploratory Composite z-score and Executive Function z-score.

PBT2 showed signs of improving some aspects of cognitive function in the study. The 250 mg dose of PBT2, administered once daily, showed better and statistically significant efficacy over the 12-week treatment period compared to placebo for the Main Composite Cognition Score (p=0.020), Exploratory composite cognition z-score (p=0.016), Executive Function composite Z score (p=0.005) and TMT Part B (p<0.001), a cognitive assessment tool. At 26 weeks, TMT Part B was statistically significantly improved (p=0.042) and the Executive Function composite z score trending to improvement. In patients with early HD (Total Functional Capacity 11-13), the Executive Function composite z score was statistically significantly improved (p=0.038).

Overall the results indicate that larger trials are needed to fully assess the safety and efficacy profile of PBT2 in AD and HD.

== Other applications ==
PBT2 has been studied for its potential use in the treatment of infections with multidrug-resistant bacteria. In combination with zinc, PBT2 has been shown to reverse antibiotic resistance for a number of clinically significant bacterial pathogens, including Streptococcus pneumoniae, methicillin-resistant Staphylococcus aureus (MRSA), group A Streptococcus (GAS), and vancomycin-resistant Enterococcus (VRE) both in vitro and in a mouse infection model.

== See also ==
- Ionophore
