= 8-Mercaptoquinoline =

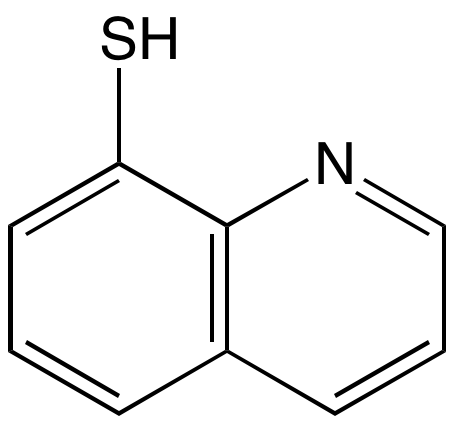

Names
- Preferred IUPAC name Quinoline-8-thiol
- Other names 8-Quinolinethiol; Mercaptoquinoline; Thiooxine

Identifiers
CAS Number	491-33-8
3D model (JSmol)	Interactive image
ChemSpider	86692
PubChem CID	96028
UNII	F77S9F93J4
CompTox Dashboard (EPA)	DTXSID70197678
- InChI: InChI=1S/C9H7NS/c11-8-5-1-3-7-4-2-6-10-9(7)8/h1-6,11H Key: MHTSJSRDFXZFHQ-UHFFFAOYSA-N; InChI=1/C9H7NS/c11-8-5-1-3-7-4-2-6-10-9(7)8/h1-6,11H Key: MHTSJSRDFXZFHQ-UHFFFAOYAD
- SMILES: c1cc2cccnc2c(c1)S

Properties
Chemical formula	C_{9}H_{8}NS
Molar mass	162.23 g·mol^{−1}
Appearance	red dihydrate, blue liquid anhydrous
Melting point	58.5 °C (137.3 °F; 331.6 K)
Boiling point	296 °C (565 °F; 569 K)
- Except where otherwise noted, data are given for materials in their standard state (at 25 °C [77 °F], 100 kPa). Infobox references

8-Mercaptoquinoline is the organosulfur compound with the formula C_{9}H_{7}NSH. It is a derivative of the heterocycle quinoline, substituted in the 8-position with a thiol group. The compound is an analog of 8-hydroxyquinoline, a common chelating agent. In terms of physical properties, this compound crystallizes as a red solid dihydrate but the anhydrous compound is a blue liquid.

8-Mercaptoquinoline functions as a bidentate ligand for many metal ions.

== Preparation ==
8-Mercaptoquinoline is usually prepared via quinoline-8-sulfonyl chloride. This species can be reduced with stannous chloride. Triphenylphosphine has also been used as a reductant.

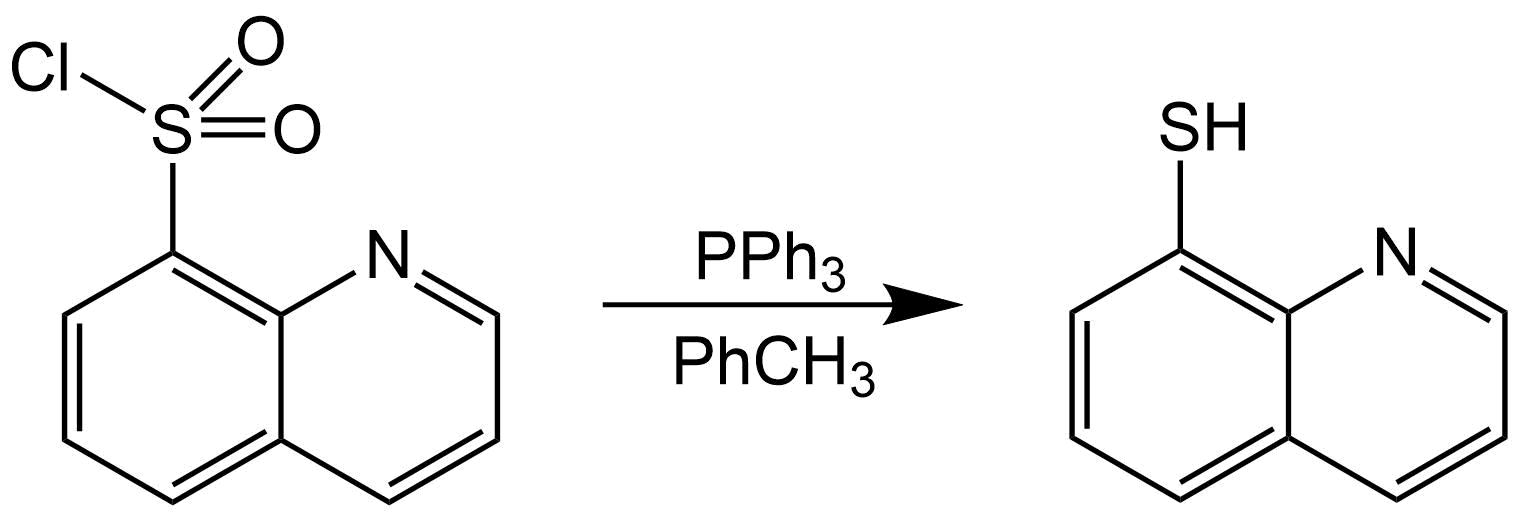
