= Trace metal detection test =

The trace metal detection test or technique was developed during the Vietnam War in the 1960s to identify people who may have been carrying firearms against their skin. A 0.2% solution of 8-hydroxyquinoline in isopropanol sprayed on the skin and illuminated with shortwave ultraviolet (UV) light after several minutes reveals a pattern and type of metal based on trace amounts of metal transferred to the skin that are invisible under normal lighting. The technique was later adopted by police in the United States to help determine if a person had carried a firearm. In a California crime an automatic handgun carried in the waistband of a criminal reportedly produced an impression of the weapon's serial number. Presence and persistence of a detectable residue depends primarily on the amount of perspiration, length of contact, and time since exposure. A few minutes of exposure can leave detectable residue and the result can remain for up to forty-eight hours.

Preservation of the results is done with black-and-white and color photography. Use of a shortwave ultraviolet filter over the camera flash can be used to record the results, although a steady source of UV is preferred. In either case a darkened area is needed for screening purposes. Another reagent, 0.5 percent 2-nitroso-1-naphthol in acetone, eliminated the need for a UV light but is limited to a four-hour-window versus the forty-eight for 8-hydroxyquinoline.
