= Salinomycin =

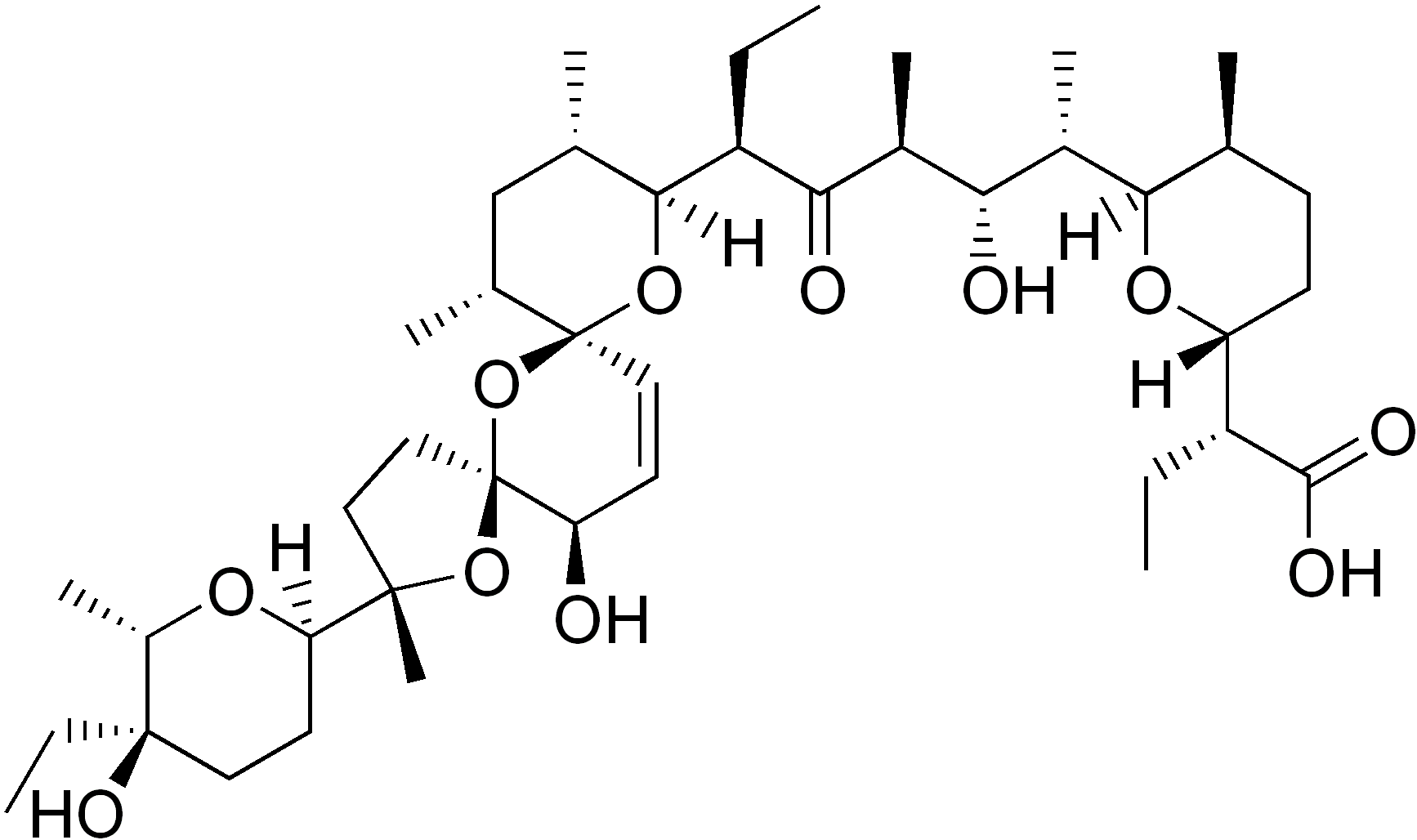

Names
- IUPAC name (2R)-2-[(5S,6R)-6-[(1S,2S,3S,5R)-5-[(2S,5R,7S,9S,10S,12R,15R)-2-[(2R,5R,6S)-5-ethyl-5-hydroxy-6-methyl-2-tetrahydropyranyl]-15-hydroxy-2,10,12-trimethyl-1,6,8-trioxadispiro[4.1.5^{7}.3^{5}]pentadec-13-en-9-yl]-2-hydroxy-1,3-dimethyl-4-oxoheptyl]-5-methyl-2-tetrahydropyranyl]butanoic acid

Identifiers
CAS Number	53003-10-4
3D model (JSmol)	Interactive image
ChEMBL	ChEMBL1208572
ChemSpider	2342058
ECHA InfoCard	100.052.974
E number	E716 (antibiotics)
PubChem CID	72370
UNII	62UXS86T64
CompTox Dashboard (EPA)	DTXSID4048486
- InChI: InChI=1S/C42H70O11/c1-11-29(38(46)47)31-15-14-23(4)36(50-31)27(8)34(44)26(7)35(45)30(12-2)37-24(5)22-25(6)41(51-37)19-16-32(43)42(53-41)21-20-39(10,52-42)33-17-18-40(48,13-3)28(9)49-33/h16,19,23-34,36-37,43-44,48H,11-15,17-18,20-22H2,1-10H3,(H,46,47)/t23-,24-,25+,26-,27-,28-,29+,30-,31+,32+,33+,34+,36+,37-,39-,40+,41-,42-/m0/s1 Key: KQXDHUJYNAXLNZ-XQSDOZFQSA-N; InChI=1/C42H70O11/c1-11-29(38(46)47)31-15-14-23(4)36(50-31)27(8)34(44)26(7)35(45)30(12-2)37-24(5)22-25(6)41(51-37)19-16-32(43)42(53-41)21-20-39(10,52-42)33-17-18-40(48,13-3)28(9)49-33/h16,19,23-34,36-37,43-44,48H,11-15,17-18,20-22H2,1-10H3,(H,46,47)/t23-,24-,25+,26-,27-,28-,29+,30-,31+,32+,33+,34+,36+,37-,39-,40+,41-,42-/m0/s1 Key: KQXDHUJYNAXLNZ-XQSDOZFQBR
- SMILES: O=C([C@H]([C@H]([C@@H]([C@]3([H])O[C@]([C@@H](CC)C(O)=O)([H])CC[C@@H]3C)C)O)C)[C@H](CC)[C@@]([C@@H](C)C[C@H]2C)([H])O[C@]12O[C@@]4(CC[C@]([C@]5([H])O[C@@H](C)[C@](CC)(O)CC5)(C)O4)[C@H](O)C=C1

Properties
Chemical formula	C_{42}H_{70}O_{11}
Molar mass	751.011 g·mol^{−1}

Pharmacology
ATCvet code	QP51BB01 (WHO)
- Except where otherwise noted, data are given for materials in their standard state (at 25 °C [77 °F], 100 kPa). verify (what is ?) Infobox references

Salinomycin is an antibacterial and coccidiostat ionophore therapeutic drug. It is widely researched for its anticancer stem cell properties.

Salinomycin is also known to isomerise in solution. This unique property complicates its structural elucidation studies in areas such as analytical chemistry and pharmaceutical development. Mass spectrometry is the primary research technique in the analysis of polyether ionophores such as salinomycin. Different salinomycin isomers can generate unique sets of product ions in the mass spectrometer. A complete structural characterisation and fragmentation pathways for salinomycin and its isomers is important in understanding its fragmentation behaviour and provides firm ground for its future clinical drug discovery research.

== Antibacterial activity ==
Salinomycin and its derivatives exhibit high antimicrobial activity against Gram-positive bacteria, including the most problematic bacteria strains such as methicillin-resistant Staphylococcus aureus and methicillin-resistant Staphylococcus epidermidis, and Mycobacterium tuberculosis. Salinomycin is inactive against fungi such as Candida and Gram-negative bacteria.

== Cancer research ==
=== Pre-clinical ===
Salinomycin has been shown by Piyush Gupta et al. of the Massachusetts Institute of Technology and the Broad Institute to kill breast cancer stem cells in mice at least 100 times more effectively than the anti-cancer drug paclitaxel. The study screened 16,000 different chemical compounds and found that only a small subset, including salinomycin and etoposide, targeted cancer stem cells responsible for metastasis and relapse.

The mechanism of action by which salinomycin kills cancer stem cells involves lysosomal iron sequestration, leading to the production of reactive oxygen species, lysosome membrane permeabilization and ferroptosis. Studies performed in 2011 showed that salinomycin could induce apoptosis of human cancer cells at higher concentrations. C20 amino derivatives such as ironomycin have shown to be more potent in vitro models of persister cancer cells and in vivo doi:10.1038/nchem.2778. Promising results from a few clinical pilot studies reveal that salinomycin is able to effectively eliminate cancer stem cells and to induce partial clinical regression of heavily pretreated and therapy-resistant cancers. The ability of salinomycin to kill both cancer stem cells and therapy-resistant cancer cells (persister) may define the compound as a novel and an effective anticancer drug. It has been also shown that salinomycin and its derivatives exhibit potent antiproliferative activity against the drug-resistant cancer cell lines. Salinomycin is the key compound in the pharmaceutical company Verastem's efforts to produce an anti-cancer-stem-cell drug.

== Use in agriculture ==
Salinomycin is used in chicken feed as a coccidiostat. Coccidiosis is a parasitic disease when farm animals are kept in area contaminated with coccidia oocysts. The parasite destructs the intestinal cells of the host animals, causing malnutrition which leads to higher mortality rates and poorer meat quality. Salinomycin acts by forming lipid-soluble complexes with alkali metal cations, results in cell death by disruption to the osmotic balance across the cell membrane.

== Biosynthesis ==
A team from the University of Cambridge has cloned and sequenced the biosynthetic cluster responsible for salinomycin production, from Streptomyces albus DSM 41398. This has shown that the polyketide backbone of salinomycin is synthesised on an assembly line of nine polyketide synthase) multienzymes. Furthermore, the cluster contains genes involved in oxidative cyclization including salC (epoxidase) and salBI/BII/BIII (epoxide hydrolase) genes. The cluster also contains genes suspected to be involved in self-resistance, export, precursor supply and regulation. The cluster contains a Non-Ribosomal Peptide Synthetase (NRPS) like carrier protein, SalX, that is suspected to tether “pre-salinomycin” during oxidative cyclization. By inactivating salC the researchers have demonstrated that salinomycin biosynthesis proceeds via a diene intermediate.

== See also ==
- Narasin a derivative of salinomycin which has an additional methyl group.
- Targeted therapy
