= Chiniofon =

Chemical compound

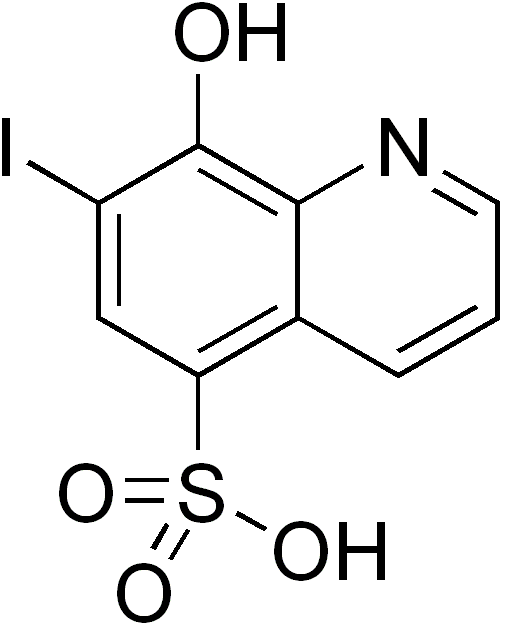

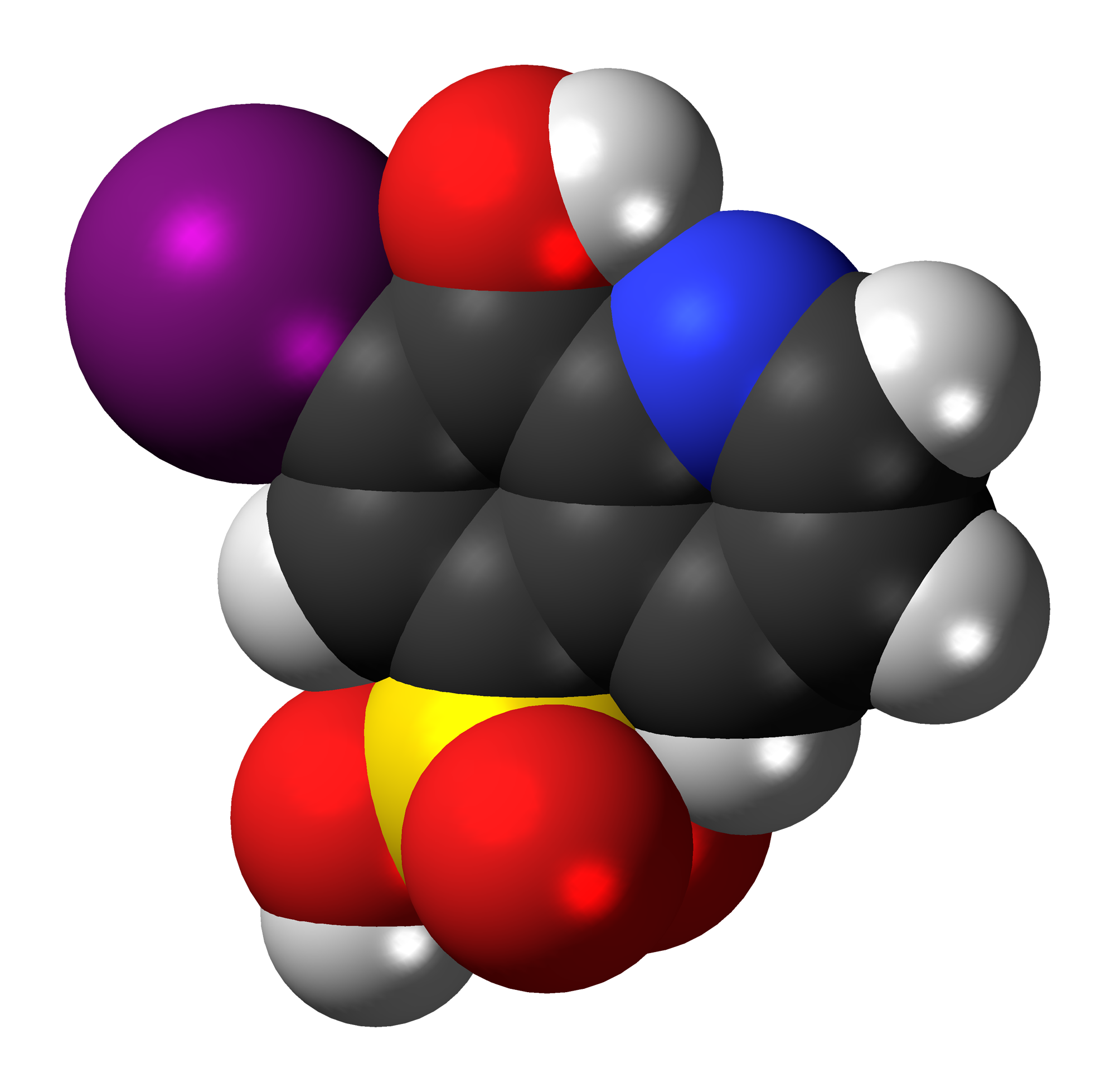

Clinical data
- AHFS/Drugs.com: International Drug Names
- ATC code: P01AX01 (WHO) QP51AX01 (WHO)

Identifiers
- IUPAC name: 8-Hydroxy-7-iodo-5-quinolinesulfonic acid
- CAS Number: 8002-90-2
- PubChem CID: 11043
- DrugBank: DB13379
- ChemSpider: 10575
- UNII: 98F8Y85B6W
- ChEMBL: ChEMBL2104146
- CompTox Dashboard (EPA): DTXSID1046136
- ECHA InfoCard: 100.008.127

Chemical and physical data
- Formula: C_{9}H_{6}INO_{4}S
- Molar mass: 351.11 g·mol^{−1}
- 3D model (JSmol): Interactive image
- SMILES: O=S(=O)(O)c1cc(I)c(O)c2ncccc12
- InChI: InChI=1S/C9H6INO4S/c10-6-4-7(16(13,14)15)5-2-1-3-11-8(5)9(6)12/h1-4,12H,(H,13,14,15); Key:ZBJWWKFMHOAPNS-UHFFFAOYSA-N

Chiniofon (Quiniofon, HIQSA, Loretin, Ferron) is an antiprotozoal agent.

== Synthesis ==
The chemical synthesis of chiniofon has been reported: It is made from 8-hydroxyquinoline starting material.
