= Zincophorin =

Names
- Preferred IUPAC name (2S)-2-{(2S,5S,6S)-5-Methyl-6-[(2S,3S,4S,5S,6S,7R,10E,12R,13R,14E,16R)-3,5,7,13-tetrahydroxy-4,6,12,14,16-pentamethylnonadeca-10,14-dien-2-yl]oxan-2-yl}propanoic acid
- Other names Griseochelin; Antibiotic M144255

Identifiers
CAS Number	95673-10-2; 91920-88-6
3D model (JSmol)	Interactive image
ChEBI	CHEBI:141377
ChemSpider	9932403
PubChem CID	11757702
- InChI: InChI=1S/C33H60O7/c1-10-13-19(2)18-22(5)29(35)20(3)14-11-12-15-27(34)23(6)30(36)25(8)31(37)26(9)32-21(4)16-17-28(40-32)24(7)33(38)39/h11,14,18-21,23-32,34-37H,10,12-13,15-17H2,1-9H3,(H,38,39)/b14-11+,22-18+/t19-,20-,21+,23+,24+,25+,26+,27-,28+,29-,30+,31+,32+/m1/s1 Key: XMCIULDTDFJACK-FXLACHKASA-N
- SMILES: CCC[C@@H](C)/C=C(\C)/[C@@H]([C@H](C)/C=C/CC[C@H]([C@H](C)[C@@H]([C@H](C)[C@@H]([C@H](C)[C@@H]1[C@H](CC[C@H](O1)[C@H](C)C(=O)O)C)O)O)O)O

Properties
Chemical formula	C_{33}H_{60}O_{7}
Molar mass	568.836 g·mol^{−1}
- Except where otherwise noted, data are given for materials in their standard state (at 25 °C [77 °F], 100 kPa). Infobox references

Zincophorin (also known as griseochelin) is an antibiotic against Gram-positive bacteria and a bacterial metabolite. It is also an ionophore. It was isolated from the bacterium Streptomyces griseus.
