= Ironomycin =

Names
- IUPAC name (2R)-2-[(2R,5S,6R)-6-{(2S,3S,4S,6R)-6-[(2S,5S,7R,9S,10S,12R,15R)-2-[(2R,5R,6S)-5-Ethyl-5-hydroxy-6-methyltetrahydro-2H-pyran-2-yl]-2,10,12-trimethyl-15-(2-propyn-1-ylamino)-1,6,8-trioxadispiro[4.1.5.3 ]pentadec-13-en-9-yl]-3-hydroxy-4-methyl-5-oxo-2-octanyl}-5-methyltetrahydro-2H-pyran-2-yl]butanoic acid

Identifiers
3D model (JSmol)	Interactive image
ChEMBL	ChEMBL4449213
ChemSpider	58838622
PubChem CID	155520759
CompTox Dashboard (EPA)	DTXSID001336731
- InChI: InChI=1S/C45H73NO10/c1-12-24-46-35-18-21-44(56-45(35)23-22-42(11,55-45)36-19-20-43(51,15-4)31(10)52-36)28(7)25-27(6)40(54-44)33(14-3)38(48)29(8)37(47)30(9)39-26(5)16-17-34(53-39)32(13-2)41(49)50/h1,18,21,26-37,39-40,46-47,51H,13-17,19-20,22-25H2,2-11H3,(H,49,50)/t26-,27-,28+,29-,30-,31-,32+,33-,34+,35+,36+,37+,39+,40-,42-,43+,44-,45-/m0/s1 Key: CPVCFIJOMZZLDG-LIAGKXCRSA-N
- SMILES: CC[C@H]([C@H]1CC[C@H](C)[C@H]([C@H]([C@H](O)[C@H](C)C([C@@H]([C@H]([C@@H](C)C[C@H]2C)O[C@@]2(C=C[C@H]3NCC#C)O[C@]43CC[C@@](C)([C@H]5CC[C@](O)(CC)[C@H](C)O5)O4)CC)=O)C)O1)C(O)=O

Properties
Chemical formula	C_{45}H_{73}NO_{10}
Molar mass	788.076 g·mol^{−1}

Pharmacology
ATCvet code	QP51AH01 (WHO)
- Except where otherwise noted, data are given for materials in their standard state (at 25 °C [77 °F], 100 kPa). Infobox references

Ironomycin is a derivative of salinomycin and potent small molecule against persister cancer stem cells, that is under preclinical evaluation by SideROS for the treatment of cancer. Ironomycin was shown to induce ferroptosis in breast cancer cell lines and its mechanism of action involves the targeting of lysosomal iron.

== Pre-clinical research ==
Ironomycin kills breast cancer stem cells in mice, and is more potent in vitro and in vivo than its parent anti-bacterial natural product salinomycin. Ironomycin and to a lesser extend salinomycin targeted cancer stem cells responsible for metastasis and relapse.

The mechanism of action by which ironomycin and salinomycin kill cancer stem cells involves lysosomal iron sequestration, leading to the production of reactive oxygen species, lysosome membrane permeabilization and ferroptosis in breast cancer. While mesenchymal breast cancer cells are vulnerable to ferroptosis, ironomycin and salinomycin can trigger cell death independently of ferroptosis in other cancer cell types.

These candidate drugs abolished the capacity of HMLER CD24^{low} to form colonies at low concentrations and ironomycin prevented these cells from developing tumorsphere in suspension, a well-established characteristic of cancer stem cells, at a low dose (ie. 30 nM). This effect on cancer stem cells have been shown in vivo where ironomycin decreased tumour-seeding capacity of tumour cells (breast PDX), more efficiently that salinomycin and Docetaxel. CD44 mediating iron endocytosis prevails in the mesenchymal state of cancer cells, and iron operates as a metal catalyst to demethylate repressive histone (H3K9) that govern the expression of mesenchymal genes.

The ability of ironomycin to kill both cancer stem cells and drug-resistant cancer cells (persister) may provide a therapeutic advantage in treating cancer. Ironomycin is the preclinical development pipeline of the biotech company SideROS for the treatment of drug resistance cancers such as acute myeloid leukemia, triple negative breast cancer, pancreatic cancer and non-hodgkin lymphoma.

== Synthesis ==
A team from ICSN has developed the chemical synthesis of salinomycin analogs, including ironomycin, which are more potent than salinomycin. Ironomycin is synthesized in two steps from salinomycin sodium salt: (1) a chemoselective allylic oxidation and (2) a chemo- and diastereoselective reductive amination at C20 leading to the alkyne derivative ironomycin.

== See also ==
- Salinomycin which is the sourcing material of ironomycin synthesis, is much less potent in vitro against persister cancer cells
- Targeted therapy
