= Nigericin =

Names
- Preferred IUPAC name (2R)-2-[(2R,3S,6R)-6-{[(2S,4R,5R,7R,9R,10R)-2-{(2S,2′R,3′S,5R,5′R)-5′-[(2S,3S,5R,6R)-6-Hydroxy-6-(hydroxymethyl)-3,5-dimethyloxan-2-yl]-2,3′-dimethyl[2,2′-bioxolan]-5-yl}-9-methoxy-2,4,10-trimethyl-1,6-dioxaspiro[4.5]decan-7-yl]methyl}-3-methyloxan-2-yl]propanoic acid
- Other names Polyetherin A, Azalomycin M, Helixin C, Helix C

Identifiers
CAS Number	28380-24-7
3D model (JSmol)	Interactive image
ChEBI	CHEBI:7569
ChEMBL	ChEMBL405862
ChemSpider	10196461
ECHA InfoCard	100.212.814
PubChem CID	34230
UNII	RRU6GY95IS
CompTox Dashboard (EPA)	DTXSID9041079
- InChI: InChI=1S/C40H68O11/c1-21-11-12-28(46-33(21)26(6)36(42)43)17-29-18-30(45-10)27(7)40(48-29)25(5)19-38(9,51-40)32-13-14-37(8,49-32)35-23(3)16-31(47-35)34-22(2)15-24(4)39(44,20-41)50-34/h21-35,41,44H,11-20H2,1-10H3,(H,42,43)/t21-,22-,23-,24+,25+,26+,27+,28+,29+,30+,31+,32+,33+,34-,35+,37-,38-,39-,40+/m0/s1 Key: DANUORFCFTYTSZ-SJSJOXFOSA-N; InChI=1/C40H68O11/c1-21-11-12-28(46-33(21)26(6)36(42)43)17-29-18-30(45-10)27(7)40(48-29)25(5)19-38(9,51-40)32-13-14-37(8,49-32)35-23(3)16-31(47-35)34-22(2)15-24(4)39(44,20-41)50-34/h21-35,41,44H,11-20H2,1-10H3,(H,42,43)/t21-,22-,23-,24+,25+,26+,27+,28+,29+,30+,31+,32+,33+,34-,35+,37-,38-,39-,40+/m0/s1 Key: DANUORFCFTYTSZ-SJSJOXFOBS
- SMILES: OC(=O)[C@H](C)[C@@H]1O[C@H](CC[C@@H]1C)C[C@H]6O[C@]2(O[C@@](C)(C[C@H]2C)[C@H]3CC[C@](C)(O3)[C@@H]4O[C@H](C[C@@H]4C)[C@H]5O[C@@](O)(CO)[C@H](C)C[C@@H]5C)[C@H](C)[C@H](OC)C6

Properties
Chemical formula	C_{40}H_{68}O_{11}
Molar mass	724.973 g·mol^{−1}
- Except where otherwise noted, data are given for materials in their standard state (at 25 °C [77 °F], 100 kPa). verify (what is ?) Infobox references

Nigericin is an antibiotic derived from Streptomyces hygroscopicus. Its isolation from soil from Nigeria was described in the 1950s, by R.L Harned (et al.), and in 1968 the structure could be elucidated by X-ray crystallography. The structure and properties of nigericin are similar to the antibiotic monensin. Commercially it is obtained as a byproduct, or contaminant, at the fermentation of geldanamycin. It is also called polyetherin A, azalomycin M, helixin C, antibiotic K178, and antibiotic X-464.

Nigericin acts as an H^{+}, K^{+}, Pb^{2+} ionophore. Most commonly it is an antiporter of H^{+} and K^{+}.

In the past nigericin was used as an antibiotic active against gram positive bacteria. It inhibits the Golgi functions in Eukaryotic cells. Its ability to induce K^{+} efflux also makes it a potent activator of the NLRP3 inflammasome
