= Fusafungine =

Chemical compound

Clinical data
- Other names: Fusafungin
- AHFS/Drugs.com: International Drug Names
- ATC code: R02AB03 (WHO)

Identifiers
- IUPAC name: cyclo[N-oxa-DL-valyl-N-methyl-L-valyl-N-oxa-DL-valyl-N-methyl-L-valyl-N-oxa-DL-valyl-N-methyl-L-valyl]
- CAS Number: 1393-87-9
- PubChem CID: 3084092
- DrugBank: DB08965
- ChemSpider: 110803986
- UNII: 65DD690W0C
- KEGG: D08002
- CompTox Dashboard (EPA): DTXSID50912008
- ECHA InfoCard: 100.014.306

Chemical and physical data
- Formula: C_{33}H_{57}N_{3}O_{9}
- Molar mass: 639.831 g·mol^{−1}
- 3D model (JSmol): Interactive image
- Melting point: 125 to 129 °C (257 to 264 °F)
- SMILES: CC(C)[C@H]1C(=O)OC(C(=O)N([C@H](C(=O)OC(C(=O)N([C@H](C(=O)OC(C(=O)N1C)C(C)C)C(C)C)C)C(C)C)C(C)C)C)C(C)C
- InChI: InChI=1S/C33H57N3O9/c1-16(2)22-31(40)43-26(20(9)10)29(38)35(14)24(18(5)6)33(42)45-27(21(11)12)30(39)36(15)23(17(3)4)32(41)44-25(19(7)8)28(37)34(22)13/h16-27H,1-15H3/t22-,23-,24-,25?,26?,27?/m0/s1; Key:MIZMDSVSLSIMSC-OGLSAIDSSA-N

Fusafungine (INN), also known as fusafungin, is an active agent used in antibiotics for treatment of nasal and throat infection. It also possesses anti-inflammatory properties. Fusafungine is a mixture of enniatin cyclohexadepsipeptides made up of alternating D-α-hydroxyvaleric acid and L-N-methylamino acid residues, produced by the ascomycete Fusarium lateritium, and marketed by Servier under the trade names Locabiotal, Bioparox, and Locabiosol.

According to a pooled analysis study done in the UK for the efficacy of fusafungine in rhinopharyngitis, it was found that the proportion of patients who showed an improvement in symptoms from Day 0 to Day 4 of infection was 61.5% with fusafungine vs. 46.8% when compared to a placebo.

In February 2016, the European Medicines Agency recommended the withdrawal of fusafungine from the market due to rare but severe allergic reactions (mainly bronchospasms).
