= A23187 =

Chemical compound

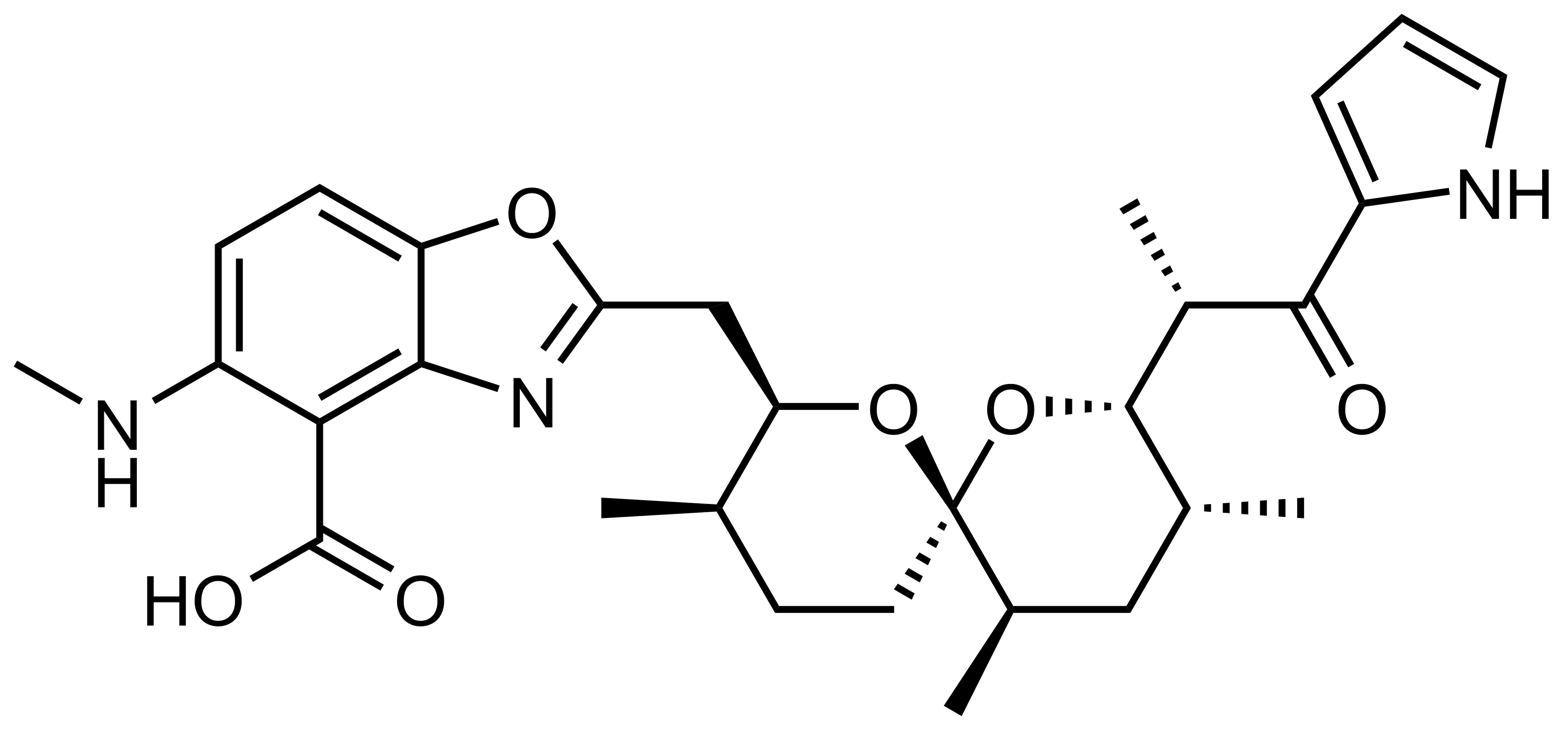

Identifiers
- IUPAC name: 5-(methylamino)-2-({(2R,3R,6S,8S,9R,11R)-3,9,11-trimethyl-8-[(1S)-1-methyl-2-oxo-2-(1H-pyrrol-2-yl)ethyl]-1,7-dioxaspiro[5.5]undec-2-yl}methyl)-1,3-benzoxazole-4-carboxylic acid
- CAS Number: 52665-69-7
- PubChem CID: 11957499
- ChemSpider: 10131749
- UNII: 37H9VM9WZL
- ChEMBL: ChEMBL1256686
- CompTox Dashboard (EPA): DTXSID1040405
- ECHA InfoCard: 100.052.786

Chemical and physical data
- Formula: C_{29}H_{37}N_{3}O_{6}
- Molar mass: 523.630 g·mol^{−1}
- 3D model (JSmol): Interactive image
- SMILES: CNc5ccc4oc(C[C@H]1O[C@@]3(CC[C@H]1C)O[C@H]([C@H](C)C(=O)c2ccc[nH]2)[C@H](C)C[C@H]3C)nc4c5C(=O)O
- InChI: InChI=1S/C29H37N3O6/c1-15-10-11-29(17(3)13-16(2)27(38-29)18(4)26(33)20-7-6-12-31-20)37-22(15)14-23-32-25-21(36-23)9-8-19(30-5)24(25)28(34)35/h6-9,12,15-18,22,27,30-31H,10-11,13-14H2,1-5H3,(H,34,35)/t15-,16-,17-,18-,22-,27+,29+/m1/s1; Key:HIYAVKIYRIFSCZ-CYEMHPAKSA-N

A23187 is a mobile ion-carrier that forms stable complexes with divalent cations (ions with a charge of +2). A23187 is also known as Calcimycin, Calcium Ionophore, Antibiotic A23187 and Calcium Ionophore A23187. It is produced at fermentation of Streptomyces chartreusensis.

== Actions and uses ==
A23187 has antibiotic properties against gram positive bacteria and fungi. It also acts as a divalent cation ionophore, allowing these ions to cross cell membranes, which are usually impermeable to them. A23187 is most selective for Mn^{2+}, somewhat less selective for Ca^{2+} and Mg^{2+}, much less selective for Sr^{2+}, and even less selective for Ba^{2+}. The ionophore is used in laboratories to increase intracellular Ca^{2+} levels in intact cells. It also uncouples oxidative phosphorylation, the process cells use to synthesize Adenosine triphosphate, which they use for energy. In addition, A23187 inhibits mitochondrial ATPase activity. A23187 also induces apoptosis in some cells (e.g. mouse lymphoma cell line, or S49, and Jurkat cells) and prevents it in others (e.g. cells dependent on interleukin 3 that have had the factor withdrawn).

Inex Pharmaceuticals Corporation (Canada) reported an innovative application of A23187. Inex used A23187 as a molecular tool in order to make artificial liposomes loaded with anti-cancer drugs such as Topotecan.

In IVF field, Ca Ionophore can be used in case of low fertilization rate after ICSI procedure, particularly with Globozoospermia (Round Head sperm syndrome), Ca Ionophore will replace absence of sperm acrosome, and plays role in oocyte activation after ICSI. Recommended use is 0.5 microgram/ml twice for 10 min interrupted with fresh media with 30 min incubation, followed with regular injected eggs culture for IVF.

== Biosynthesis ==
The core biosynthetic enzymes are thought to include 3 proteins for the biosynthesis of the α-ketopyrrole moiety, 5 for modular type I polyketide synthases for the spiroketal ring, 4 for the biosynthesis of 3-hydroxyanthranilic acid, an N-methyltransferase tailoring enzyme, and a type II thioesterase.

== Commercial availability ==
Commercially, A23187 is available as free acid, Ca^{2+} salt, and 4-brominated analog.
