= Quinprenaline =

Clinical data
- Other names: Quinterenol
- Drug class: β-Adrenergic receptor agonist; Sympathomimetic; Bronchodilator

Identifiers
- IUPAC name: 5-[1-hydroxy-2-(propan-2-ylamino)ethyl]quinolin-8-ol
- CAS Number: 13757-97-6
- PubChem CID: 26258
- ChemSpider: 24465
- UNII: 100EPZ8Y7G
- ChEMBL: ChEMBL2009119
- CompTox Dashboard (EPA): DTXSID70864439

Chemical and physical data
- Formula: C_{14}H_{18}N_{2}O_{2}
- Molar mass: 246.310 g·mol^{−1}
- 3D model (JSmol): Interactive image
- SMILES: CC(C)NCC(C1=C2C=CC=NC2=C(C=C1)O)O
- InChI: InChI=1S/C14H18N2O2/c1-9(2)16-8-13(18)10-5-6-12(17)14-11(10)4-3-7-15-14/h3-7,9,13,16-18H,8H2,1-2H3; Key:RSDQHEMTUCMUPQ-UHFFFAOYSA-N

Quinprenaline (INN; also known as quinterenol) is a sympathomimetic, long-acting β-adrenergic receptor agonist, and bronchodilator of the phenethylamine family that was never approved for human use. It was first described by the 1960s.
