= Subacute myelo-optic neuropathy =

- Specialty: Neurology

Subacute myelo-optic neuropathy (SMON) is an iatrogenic disease of the nervous system leading to a disabling paralysis, blindness and even death. Its defining manifestation was as an epidemic in Japan during the 1960s: the Japanese government estimated 11,000 were affected; however, the College of Medicine at the University of Tokyo put the number at 30,000, citing a lack of preservation of medical records for longer than five years and a lack of cooperation from doctors as the reasons for the discrepancy.

In September 1970 the president of the Central Pharmaceutical Affairs Council, Morizo Ishidate, ordered a stop to the use of clioquinol, marketed as quinoform, because he had correctly deduced that SMON was caused by clioquinol intoxication. On August 3, 1978, the Tokyo District Court ruled that the cause of SMON is Clioquinol. Its manufacturer, Ciba-Geigy, has publicly stated that "Medical products manufactured and sold by us have been responsible for the occurrence of [SMON] in Japan, we extend our apologies."

SMON was first observed and diagnosed in Sweden 1966, by the pediatrician and neurologist Olle Hansson. Clioquinol was marketed as a prophylaxis to tourist diarrhoea. Dr. Olle Hansson was in the front line, fighting for a ban of clioquinol. Doctors in many countries boycotted Ciba-Geigy for many years. Not until 1985 was the pharmaceutical withdrawn. Dr Hansson died a few months later. The day of his death, May 23, is observed as the Anti-Hazardous Drug Day in several parts of the world.
