= Streptomyces werraensis =

Scientific classification
- Domain: Bacteria
- Kingdom: Bacillati
- Phylum: Actinomycetota
- Class: Actinomycetes
- Order: Streptomycetales
- Family: Streptomycetaceae
- Genus: Streptomyces
- Species: S. werraensis

Binomial name
- Streptomyces werraensis Wallhäusser et al. 1964

Type strain
- ATCC 14424, BCRC 12038, CBS 437.67, CBS 705.72, CCRC 12038, CGMCC 4.1935, DSM 40486, DSM 40745, FH 1282, Fh-3582, IFO 13404, ISP 5486, JCM 4860, KCTC 19066, NBRC 13404, NRRL B-5317, NRRL-ISP 5486, RIA 1365

Species of bacterium

Streptomyces werraensis is an alkaliphilic bacterium species from the genus of Streptomyces. Streptomyces werraensis produces nonactin, erythromycin and werramycine.

== See also ==
- List of Streptomyces species
