= Monensin =

Monensin A

Names
- Preferred IUPAC name (2S,3R,4S)-4-[(2S,5R,7S,8R,9S)-2-{(2S,2′R,3′S,5R,5′R)-2-Ethyl-5′-[(2S,3S,5R,6R)-6-hydroxy-6-(hydroxymethyl)-3,5-dimethyloxan-2-yl]-3′-methyl[2,2′-bioxolan]-5-yl}-9-hydroxy-2,8-dimethyl-1,6-dioxaspiro[4.5]decan-7-yl]-3-methoxy-2-methylpentanoic acid
- Other names Monensic acid

Identifiers
CAS Number	17090-79-8
3D model (JSmol)	Interactive image
ChEBI	CHEBI:27617
ChEMBL	ChEMBL256105
ChemSpider	389937
ECHA InfoCard	100.037.398
E number	E714 (antibiotics)
KEGG	D08228
PubChem CID	441145
UNII	906O0YJ6ZP
CompTox Dashboard (EPA)	DTXSID4048561
- InChI: InChI=1S/C36H62O11/c1-10-34(31-20(3)16-26(43-31)28-19(2)15-21(4)36(41,18-37)46-28)12-11-27(44-34)33(8)13-14-35(47-33)17-25(38)22(5)30(45-35)23(6)29(42-9)24(7)32(39)40/h19-31,37-38,41H,10-18H2,1-9H3,(H,39,40)/t19-,20-,21+,22+,23-,24-,25-,26+,27+,28-,29+,30-,31+,33-,34-,35+,36-/m0/s1 Key: GAOZTHIDHYLHMS-KEOBGNEYSA-N; InChI=1/C36H62O11/c1-10-34(31-20(3)16-26(43-31)28-19(2)15-21(4)36(41,18-37)46-28)12-11-27(44-34)33(8)13-14-35(47-33)17-25(38)22(5)30(45-35)23(6)29(42-9)24(7)32(39)40/h19-31,37-38,41H,10-18H2,1-9H3,(H,39,40)/t19-,20-,21+,22+,23-,24-,25-,26+,27+,28-,29+,30-,31+,33-,34-,35+,36-/m0/s1 Key: GAOZTHIDHYLHMS-KEOBGNEYBF
- SMILES: O=C(O)[C@@H](C)[C@H](OC)[C@H](C)[C@H]5O[C@]1(O[C@@](C)(CC1)[C@@H]2O[C@@](CC)(CC2)[C@@H]4O[C@@H]([C@H]3O[C@@](O)(CO)[C@@H](C[C@@H]3C)C)C[C@@H]4C)C[C@H](O)[C@H]5C

Properties
Chemical formula	C_{36}H_{62}O_{11}
Molar mass	670.871 g/mol
Appearance	solid state, white crystals
Melting point	104 °C (219 °F; 377 K)
Solubility in water	3×10^{−6} g/dm^{3} (20 °C)
Solubility	ethanol, acetone, diethyl ether, benzene

Pharmacology
ATCvet code	QA16QA06 (WHO) QP51BB03 (WHO)
Legal status	CA: ℞-only

Related compounds
Related	antibiotics, ionophores
Related compounds	Monensin A methyl ester,
- Except where otherwise noted, data are given for materials in their standard state (at 25 °C [77 °F], 100 kPa). verify (what is ?) Infobox references

Monensin is a polyether antibiotic isolated from Streptomyces cinnamonensis. It is widely used in ruminant animal feeds.

The structure of monensin was first described by Agtarap et al. in 1967, and was the first polyether antibiotic to have its structure elucidated in this way. The first total synthesis of monensin was reported in 1979 by Kishi et al.

== Mechanism of action ==
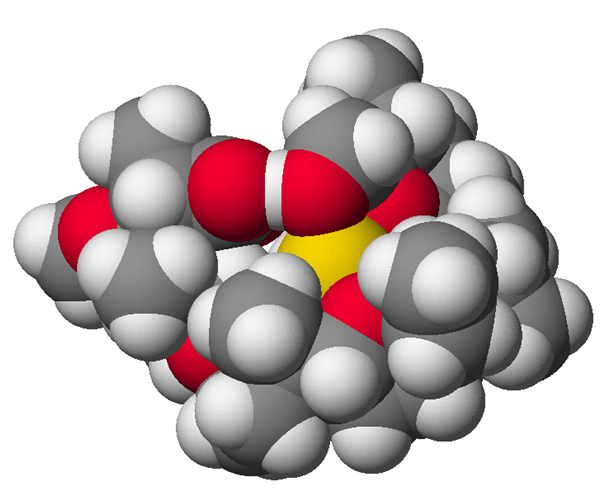
The structure of the sodium (Na^{+}) complex of monensin A.

Monensin A is an ionophore related to the crown ethers with a preference to form complexes with monovalent cations such as: Li^{+}, Na^{+}, K^{+}, Rb^{+}, Ag^{+}, and Tl^{+}. Monensin A is able to transport these cations across lipid membranes of cells in an electroneutral (i.e. non-depolarizing) exchange, playing an important role as an Na^{+}/H^{+} antiporter. Recent studies have shown that monensin may transport sodium ion through the membrane in both electrogenic and electroneutral manner. This approach explains ionophoric ability and in consequence antibacterial properties of not only parental monensin, but also its derivatives that do not possess carboxylic groups. It blocks intracellular protein transport, and exhibits antibiotic, antimalarial, and other biological activities. The antibacterial properties of monensin and its derivatives are a result of their ability to transport metal cations through cellular and subcellular membranes.

== Uses ==
Monensin is used extensively in the beef and dairy industries to prevent coccidiosis, increase the production of propionic acid and prevent bloat. Furthermore, monensin, but also its derivatives monensin methyl ester (MME), and particularly monensin decyl ester (MDE) are widely used in ion-selective electrodes. In laboratory research, monensin is used extensively to block Golgi transport.

== Toxicity ==
Monensin has some degree of activity on mammalian cells and thus toxicity is common. This is especially pronounced in horses, where monensin has a median lethal dose 1/100 that of ruminants. Accidental poisoning of equines with monensin is a well-documented occurrence which has resulted in deaths.
