= Maduramicin =

Chemical compound

Clinical data
- Other names: Maduramycin
- AHFS/Drugs.com: International Drug Names
- ATCvet code: QP51BB05 (WHO)

Identifiers
- CAS Number: 84878-61-5; acid: 79356-08-4
- PubChem CID: 68595
- ChemSpider: 61862
- UNII: 5U912U22T2; acid: 6S6GVE3CIQ
- ChEMBL: ChEMBL1909066
- CompTox Dashboard (EPA): DTXSID001044546

Chemical and physical data
- Formula: C_{47}H_{80}O_{17}
- Molar mass: 917.140 g·mol^{−1}
- 3D model (JSmol): Interactive image
- SMILES: O=C(O)C[C@@]1(O)O[C@H]([C@H](OC)[C@@H](OC)[C@@H]1C)[C@H](C)[C@H]7O[C@]6(O[C@](C)([C@@H]5O[C@](C)([C@@H]4O[C@@H]([C@H]2O[C@@](O)(C)[C@H](C)C[C@@H]2C)C[C@@H]4O[C@H]3O[C@@H](C)[C@H](OC)[C@@H](OC)C3)CC5)CC6)C[C@H](O)[C@H]7C

Maduramicin (maduramycin) is an antiprotozoal agent used in veterinary medicine to prevent coccidiosis. It is a natural chemical compound first isolated from the actinomycete Actinomadura rubra.
