= Nonactin =

Names
- Other names Ammonium ionophore

Identifiers
CAS Number	6833-84-7
3D model (JSmol)	Interactive image
ChEMBL	ChEMBL415914
ChemSpider	65428
ECHA InfoCard	100.027.192
PubChem CID	72519
UNII	TTP24WX8P7
CompTox Dashboard (EPA)	DTXSID10218477
- InChI: InChI=1S/C40H64O12/c1-21-17-29-9-13-34(49-29)26(6)38(42)46-23(3)19-31-11-15-36(51-31)28(8)40(44)48-24(4)20-32-12-16-35(52-32)27(7)39(43)47-22(2)18-30-10-14-33(50-30)25(5)37(41)45-21/h21-36H,9-20H2,1-8H3/t21-,22+,23+,24-,25-,26+,27+,28-,29-,30+,31+,32-,33-,34+,35+,36- Key: RMIXHJPMNBXMBU-QIIXEHPYSA-N; InChI=1/C40H64O12/c1-21-17-29-9-13-34(49-29)26(6)38(42)46-23(3)19-31-11-15-36(51-31)28(8)40(44)48-24(4)20-32-12-16-35(52-32)27(7)39(43)47-22(2)18-30-10-14-33(50-30)25(5)37(41)45-21/h21-36H,9-20H2,1-8H3/t21-,22+,23+,24-,25-,26+,27+,28-,29-,30+,31+,32-,33-,34+,35+,36- Key: RMIXHJPMNBXMBU-QIIXEHPYBK
- SMILES: C[C@@H]1C[C@H]2CC[C@H](O2)[C@@H](C(=O)O[C@H](C[C@@H]3CC[C@@H](O3)[C@H](C(=O)O[C@@H](C[C@H]4CC[C@H](O4)[C@@H](C(=O)O[C@H](C[C@@H]5CC[C@@H](O5)[C@H](C(=O)O1)C)C)C)C)C)C)C

Properties
Chemical formula	C_{40}H_{64}O_{12}
Molar mass	736.940 g·mol^{−1}
Melting point	146 °C (295 °F; 419 K)
- Except where otherwise noted, data are given for materials in their standard state (at 25 °C [77 °F], 100 kPa). Infobox references

Nonactin is a member of a family of naturally occurring cyclic ionophores known as the macrotetrolide antibiotics. The other members of this homologous family are monactin, dinactin, trinactin and tetranactin which are all neutral ionophoric substances and higher homologs of nonactin. Collectively, this class is known as the nactins. Nonactin is soluble in acetone, dichloromethane, ethyl acetate and DMSO, but insoluble in water.

== Sources ==
Nonactin is commercially available; as of 2006, these bacterial species produce nonactin: Streptomyces tsukubensis, Streptomyces griseus, Streptomyces chrysomallus and Streptomyces werraensis. Total syntheses have been reported.

== Structure and properties ==
Nonactin was isolated by Corbaz et al. in 1955 from bacterial strains. It is composed of four tetrahydrofuran rings and four esters linked by saturated aliphatic chain sections. Nonactin has a 48-member ring, built from 40 carbon and 12 (8 on the ring, 4 as ketones) oxygen atoms. Despite the 16 stereogenic centers, Nonactin is a meso compound, and therefore achiral. Liquid chromatography-mass spectrometry offers a modern approach to obtain more detailed process control data than the spectrophotometric and chromatographic measurements used in the past.

== Reactions ==
Nonactin is known for its ability to form complexes with alkali cations, most notably potassium and sodium. In general, nonactin (and other members of the nactin family) exhibits binding preferences for some ions over others. This ion selectivity is seen in other macrocyclic ligands, such as the cyclic ionophore valinomycin, which is also an antibiotic, and crown ethers. Although nonactin (and all nactins) exhibits an especially high cation selectivity for potassium ions over sodium ions or rubidium ions, it exhibits the highest selectivity for ammonium ions and thallium ions. Due to this property, nonactin is also called "ammonium ionophore".

During complexation, the nonactin backbone convolutes into a pattern resembling the seam of a tennis ball. In the potassium-nonactin complex, the potassium ion is entirely surrounded by four carbonyl oxygen atoms and the four oxygen atoms of the tetrahydrofuran ring. These eight oxygen atoms surrounding the ion are nearly equidistant from it and adopt a nearly cubic coordination sphere around the ion. In this complex, all polar carbonyl groups point inwards and nonpolar moieties point outwards, thus building up a hydrophobic exterior for the complex and making it soluble in lipid membranes. This is how nonactin is able to transport potassium ions across lipid membranes.

== Biological effects ==
Nonactin has been reported to specifically inhibit the processing of cytoplasmic precursor proteins destined for the mitochondria. It is able to uncouple the oxidative phosphorylation of mitochondria of rat liver in a low concentration, and can also carry cations across biological and artificial membranes.

A nactins mixture, purposely enriched in tetranactin and poor in nonactin, known as polynactin(C), was used as a pesticide, but since 2004 is not used any more, presumably because its residuals appeared in food.

== Applications ==
Nactins have no known medical use. Ultrapure nonactin, practically free of other nactins, is used for ammonium-specific electrodes.
