= Chloroxine =

Chemical compound

Clinical data
- Trade names: Capitrol
- Other names: cloroxinum, kloroxin, chlorquinol, dichlorchinolinolum, halquinol(s)
- AHFS/Drugs.com: Micromedex Detailed Consumer Information
- ATC code: none

Legal status
- Legal status: US: ℞-only

Identifiers
- IUPAC name: 5,7-dichloroquinolin-8-ol
- CAS Number: 773-76-2
- PubChem CID: 2722
- ChemSpider: 2621
- UNII: 2I8BD50I8B
- ChEMBL: ChEMBL1200596
- CompTox Dashboard (EPA): DTXSID5022801
- ECHA InfoCard: 100.011.144

Chemical and physical data
- Formula: C_{9}H_{5}Cl_{2}NO
- Molar mass: 214.05 g·mol^{−1}
- 3D model (JSmol): Interactive image
- SMILES: Clc1c(O)c2ncccc2c(Cl)c1
- InChI: InChI=1S/C9H5Cl2NO/c10-6-4-7(11)9(13)8-5(6)2-1-3-12-8/h1-4,13H; Key:WDFKMLRRRCGAKS-UHFFFAOYSA-N

Chloroxine (trade name Capitrol; Kloroxin, Dichlorchinolinol, chlorquinol, halquinol(s)); Latin cloroxinum, dichlorchinolinolum) is an antibacterial drug. Oral formulations (under trade name such as Endiaron) are used in infectious diarrhea, disorders of the intestinal microflora (e.g. after antibiotic treatment), giardiasis, inflammatory bowel disease. It is also useful for dandruff and seborrheic dermatitis., as used in shampoos (Capitrol) and dermal creams like (Valpeda, Triaderm).

== Mechanism of action ==
Chloroxine has bacteriostatic, fungistatic, and antiprotozoal properties. It is effective against Streptococci, Staphylococci, Candida, Candida albicans, Shigella, and Trichomonads.

== Adverse effects ==
Rarely occurs, but may cause nausea and vomiting associated with oral administration. It may also cause skin irritation.

== Pregnancy and lactation ==
The FDA lists chloroxine in Pregnancy Category C (risk cannot be ruled out) because no pregnancy studies on the medication have been performed with animals or humans. For this reason, use of chloroxine oral or topical during pregnancy or when breast-feeding is not recommended.

== History ==
Chloroxine was first prepared in 1888 by A. Hebebrand.
