= Pyrrolidine dithiocarbamate =

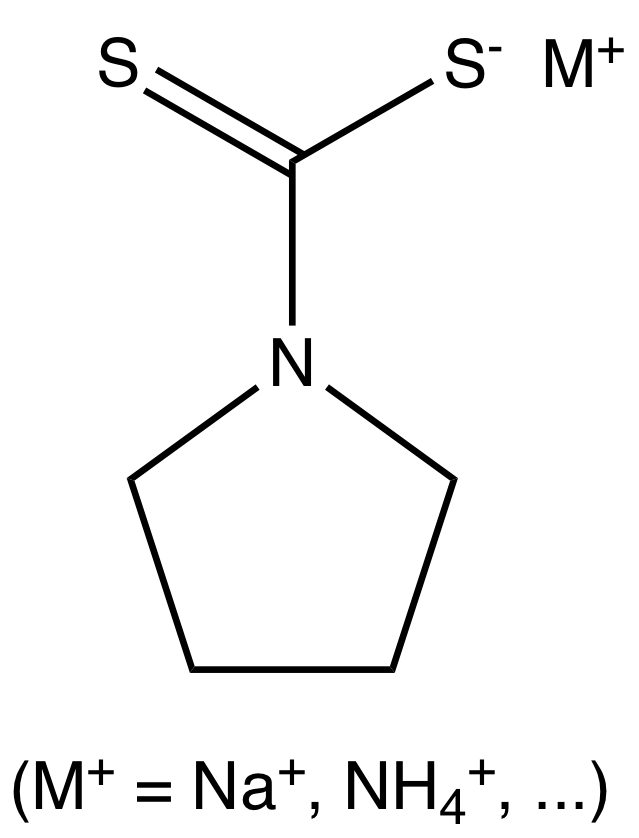

Names
- IUPAC name Pyrrolidine-1-carbodithioic acid
- Other names Pyrrolidinedithiocarbamate; 1-Pyrrolidinecarbodithioic acid; Pyrrolidine dithiocarbamic acid

Identifiers
CAS Number	25769-03-3
3D model (JSmol)	Interactive image
Abbreviations	PDTC
ChEBI	CHEBI:78782
ChemSpider	58828
PubChem CID	65351
UNII	RG3HRQ45HY
CompTox Dashboard (EPA)	DTXSID00180437
- InChI: InChI=1S/C5H9NS2/c7-5(8)6-3-1-2-4-6/h1-4H2,(H,7,8) Key: VSWDORGPIHIGNW-UHFFFAOYSA-N; InChI=1/C5H9NS2/c7-5(8)6-3-1-2-4-6/h1-4H2,(H,7,8) Key: VSWDORGPIHIGNW-UHFFFAOYAF
- SMILES: C1CCN(C1)C(=S)S

Properties
Chemical formula	C_{5}H_{9}NS_{2}
Molar mass	147.25 g·mol^{−1}
Density	1.264 g/cm^{3}
Boiling point	199.7 °C (391.5 °F; 472.8 K) at 760 mm Hg

Hazards
Flash point	74.6 °C (166.3 °F; 347.8 K)
- Except where otherwise noted, data are given for materials in their standard state (at 25 °C [77 °F], 100 kPa). verify (what is ?) Infobox references

Pyrrolidine dithiocarbamate (PDTC) are a family of closely related drugs used for a metal chelation, induction of G1 phase cell cycle arrest, and preventing induction of nitric oxide synthase.

Pyrrolidine dithiocarbamate binds zinc such that the resulting complex can enter the cell and inhibit viral RNA-dependent RNA polymerase.

== Reactions ==
Pyrrolidine dithiocarbamate, like other dithiocarbamates, forms coordination complexes with a variety of transition metals. One example is Fe(S_{2}CNC_{4}H_{8})_{3}.

== See also ==
- ionophore
