= Narasin =

Chemical compound

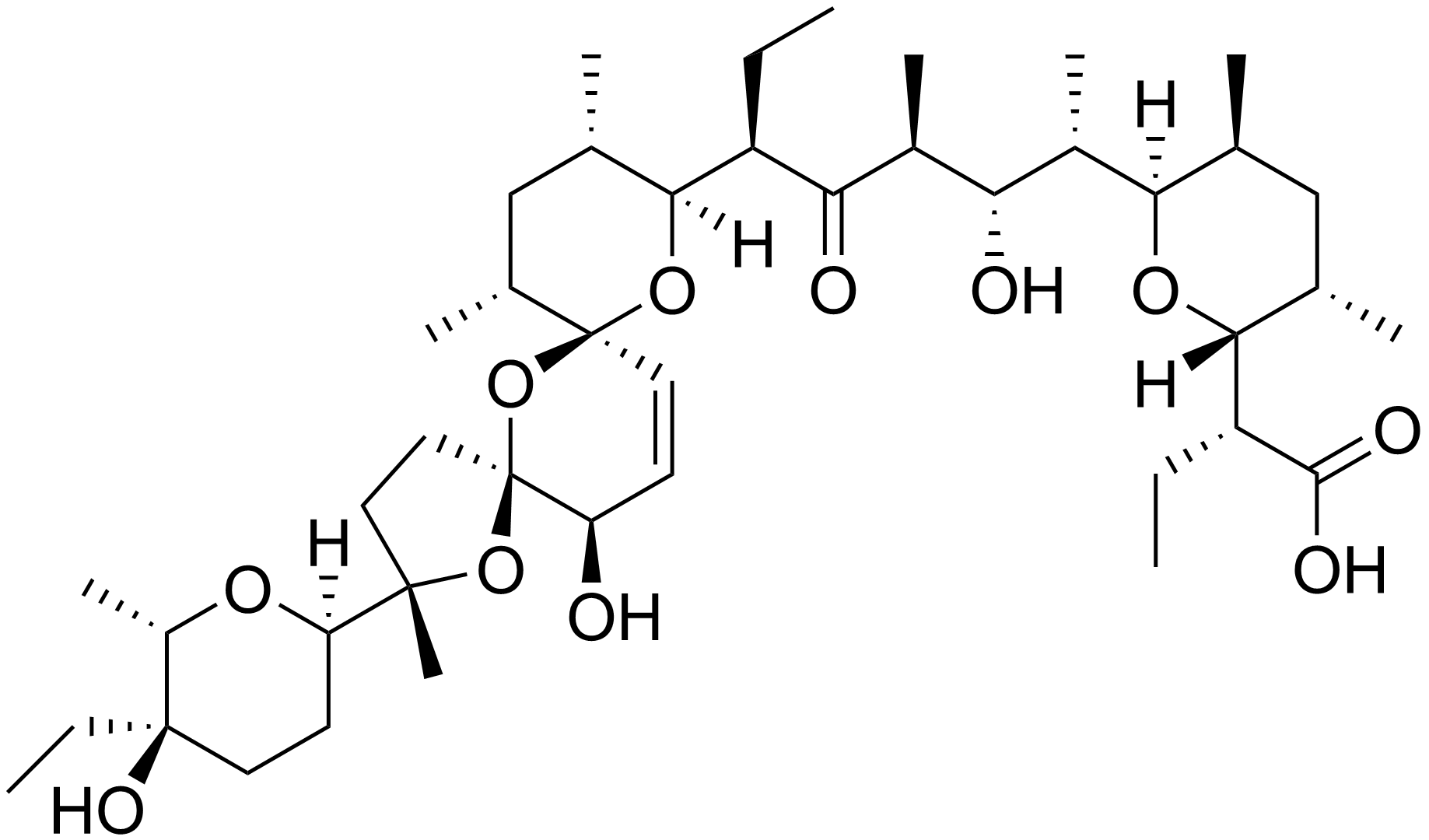

Clinical data
- Other names: (4S)-4-methyl-salinomycin
- AHFS/Drugs.com: International Drug Names
- ATCvet code: QP51BB04 (WHO) QP51BB54 (WHO)

Identifiers
- IUPAC name: (2R)-2-[(2R,3S,5S,6R)-6-[(1S,2S,3S,5R)-5- [(2S,5S,7R,9S,10S,12R,15R)-2-[(2R,5R,6S)-5-ethyl-5-hydroxy-6-methyl-2-tetrahydropyranyl]-15-hydroxy-2,10,12-trimethyl-1,6,8-trioxadispiro[4.1.5^{7}.3^{5}]pentadec-13-en-9-yl]-2-hydroxy-1,3-dimethyl-4-oxoheptyl]-3,5-dimethyl-2-tetrahydropyranyl]butanoic acid
- CAS Number: 55134-13-9
- PubChem CID: 65452
- ChemSpider: 58911
- UNII: DZY9VU539P
- CompTox Dashboard (EPA): DTXSID2046707
- ECHA InfoCard: 100.122.892

Chemical and physical data
- Formula: C_{43}H_{72}O_{11}
- Molar mass: 765.038 g·mol^{−1}
- 3D model (JSmol): Interactive image
- SMILES: O=C([C@@H](C)[C@@H](O)[C@H](C)[C@]5([H])O[C@]([C@@H](CC)C(O)=O)([H])[C@@H](C)C[C@@H]5C)[C@H](CC)[C@@]1([H])O[C@@]2(O[C@@]3(CC[C@]([C@]4([H])O[C@@H](C)[C@@](O)(CC)CC4)(C)O3)[C@H](O)C=C2)[C@H](C)C[C@@H]1C
- InChI: InChI=1S/C43H72O11/c1-12-30(35(46)27(8)34(45)28(9)36-23(4)21-24(5)37(51-36)31(13-2)39(47)48)38-25(6)22-26(7)42(52-38)18-15-32(44)43(54-42)20-19-40(11,53-43)33-16-17-41(49,14-3)29(10)50-33/h15,18,23-34,36-38,44-45,49H,12-14,16-17,19-22H2,1-11H3,(H,47,48)/t23-,24-,25-,26+,27-,28-,29-,30-,31+,32+,33+,34+,36+,37+,38-,40-,41+,42-,43-/m0/s1; Key:VHKXXVVRRDYCIK-CWCPJSEDSA-N

Narasin is a coccidiostat and antibacterial agent. It is a derivative of salinomycin with an additional methyl group. Narasin is produced by fermentation of a strain of Streptomyces aureofaciens.
