= Beauvericin =

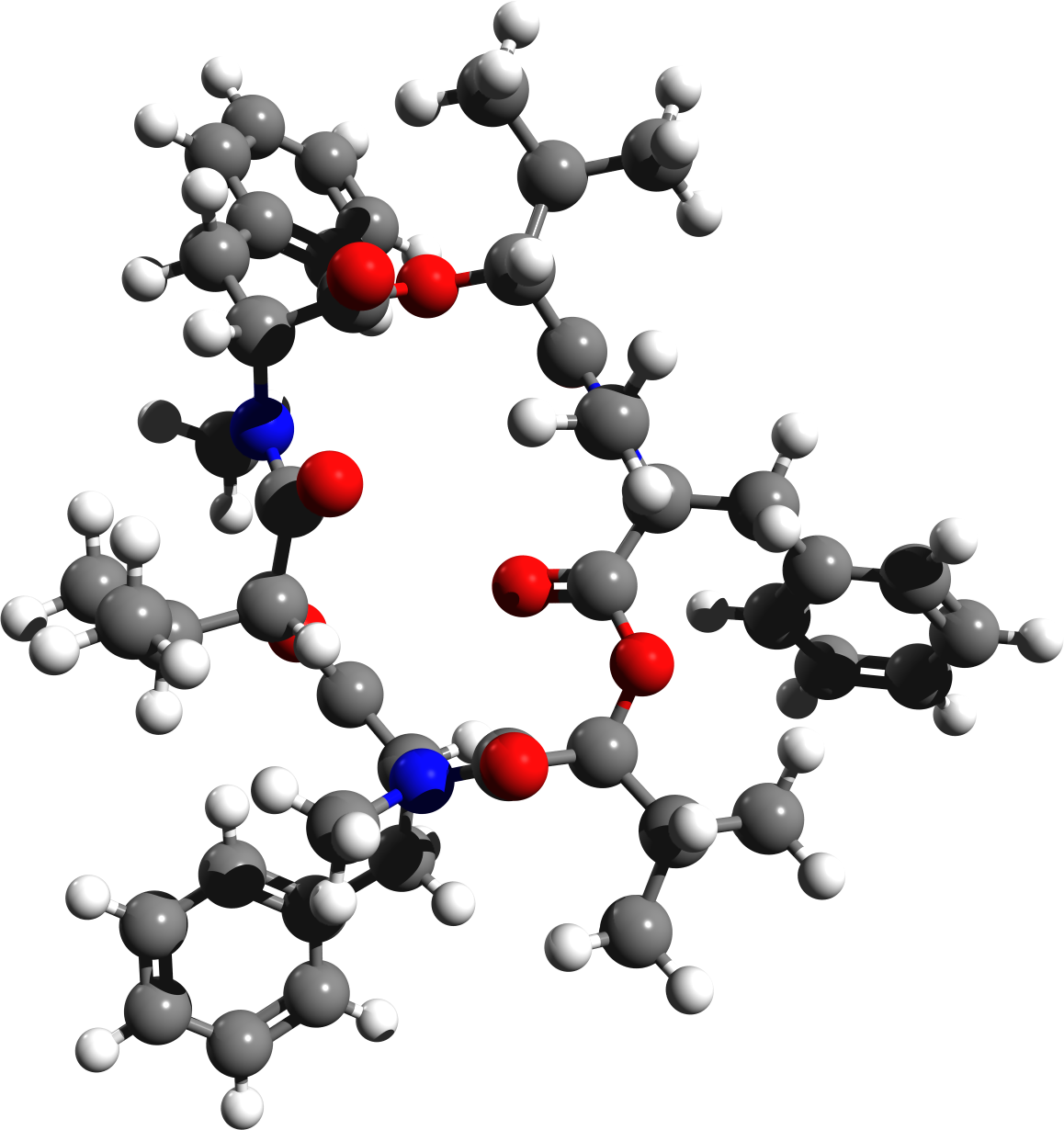

Names
- IUPAC name (3S,6R,9S,12R,15S,18R)-3,9,15-Tribenzyl-6,12,18-triisopropyl-4,10,16-trimethyl-1,7,13-trioxa-4,10,16-triazacyclooctadecane-2,5,8,11,14,17-hexone

Identifiers
CAS Number	26048-05-5
3D model (JSmol)	Interactive image
ChEBI	CHEBI:3000
ChEMBL	ChEMBL373872
ChemSpider	2277520
KEGG	C11590
PubChem CID	3007984
UNII	26S048LS2R
CompTox Dashboard (EPA)	DTXSID00891834
- InChI: InChI=1S/C45H57N3O9/c1-28(2)37-40(49)46(7)35(26-32-21-15-11-16-22-32)44(53)56-39(30(5)6)42(51)48(9)36(27-33-23-17-12-18-24-33)45(54)57-38(29(3)4)41(50)47(8)34(43(52)55-37)25-31-19-13-10-14-20-31/h10-24,28-30,34-39H,25-27H2,1-9H3/t34-,35-,36-,37+,38+,39+/m0/s1 Key: GYSCAQFHASJXRS-FFCOJMSVSA-N; InChI=1/C45H57N3O9/c1-28(2)37-40(49)46(7)35(26-32-21-15-11-16-22-32)44(53)56-39(30(5)6)42(51)48(9)36(27-33-23-17-12-18-24-33)45(54)57-38(29(3)4)41(50)47(8)34(43(52)55-37)25-31-19-13-10-14-20-31/h10-24,28-30,34-39H,25-27H2,1-9H3/t34-,35-,36-,37+,38+,39+/m0/s1 Key: GYSCAQFHASJXRS-FFCOJMSVBB
- SMILES: O=C1N(C)[C@H](C(=O)O[C@@H](C(=O)N([C@H](C(=O)O[C@@H](C(=O)N([C@H](C(=O)O[C@@H]1C(C)C)Cc2ccccc2)C)C(C)C)Cc3ccccc3)C)C(C)C)Cc4ccccc4

Properties
Chemical formula	C_{45}H_{57}N_{3}O_{9}
Molar mass	783.963 g·mol^{−1}
- Except where otherwise noted, data are given for materials in their standard state (at 25 °C [77 °F], 100 kPa). verify (what is ?) Infobox references

Beauvericin is a depsipeptide with antibiotic and insecticidal effects belonging to the enniatin family. It was isolated from the fungus Beauveria bassiana, but is also produced by several other fungi, including several Fusarium species; it may therefore occur in grain (such as corn, wheat and barley) contaminated with these fungi. Beauvericin is active against Gram-positive bacteria and mycobacteria, and is also capable of inducing programmed cell death in mammals.

Chemically, beauvericin is a cyclic hexadepsipeptide with alternating N-methyl-phenylalanyl and D-hydroxy-iso-valeryl residues. Its ion-complexing capability allows beauvericin to transport alkaline earth metal and alkali metal ions across cell membranes.

Beauvericin has in vitro fungicidal effects on Candida parapsilosis when used in combination with the antifungal drug ketoconazole at dosages of 0.1 μg/ml. Increased survivability rates and low cytotoxicity were also observed in mouse models.
