= Amebicide =

Drugs destructive to amoeba

An amebicide (or amoebicide) is an agent that is destructive to amoeba, especially parasitic amoeba that cause amoebiasis.

== Entamoeba ==
- Metronidazole, or a related drug such as tinidazole, secnidazole or ornidazole, is used to destroy amoebae that have invaded tissue.
- Several drugs are available for treating intestinal infections, the most effective of which has been shown to be paromomycin (also known as Humatin).

E. histolytica infections occur in both the intestine and (in people with symptoms) in tissue of the intestine and/or liver. As a result, both tissue and luminal drugs are needed to treat the infection, one for each location. Metronidazole is usually given first, followed by paromomycin or diloxanide.

E. dispar does not require treatment, but many laboratories (even in the developed world) do not have the facilities to distinguish this from E. histolytica.

=== Tissue amebicides ===
Metronidazole, or a related drug such as tinidazole, secnidazole or ornidazole, is used to destroy amoebae that have invaded tissue. These are rapidly absorbed into the bloodstream and transported to the site of infection. Because they are rapidly absorbed there is almost none remaining in the intestine.

For amebic dysentery a multi-prong approach must be used, starting with one of:

- metronidazole 500–750 mg three times a day for 5–10 days
- tinidazole 2g once a day for 3 days is an alternative to metronidazole

Doses for children are calculated by body weight and a pharmacist should be consulted for help.

=== Luminal amebicides ===
Since most of the amoebae remain in the intestine when tissue invasion occurs, it is important to get rid of those also or the patient will be at risk of developing another case of invasive disease. Several drugs are available for treating intestinal infections, the most effective of which has been shown to be paromomycin (also known as Humatin); iodoquinol (also known as Yodoxin) is used in the US; and diloxanide furoate (also known as Furamide) is used in certain other countries.

In addition to the tissue amebicides above, one of the following lumenal amebicides should be prescribed as an adjunctive treatment, either concurrently or sequentially, to destroy E. histolytica in the colon:

- Paromomycin 500 mg three times a day for 10 days
- Iodoquinol 650 mg three times a day for 20 days

Doses for children are calculated by body weight and a pharmacist should be consulted for help.

=== Amebic liver abscess ===
For amebic liver abscess:

- Metronidazole 400 mg three times a day for 10 days
- Tinidazole 2g once a day for 6 days is an alternative to metronidazole
- Diloxanide furoate 500 mg three times a day for 10 days (or one of the other lumenal amebicides above) must always be given afterwards

Doses for children are calculated by body weight and a pharmacist should be consulted for help.

== Acanthamoeba ==
Propamidine isethionate has been used in the treatment of Acanthamoeba infection.

== Treatment by use of primitive medicines ==
The Nicobarese people have attested to the medicinal properties found in Glochidion calocarpum, a plant endemic to India, saying that its bark and seed are most effective in curing abdominal disorders associated with amoebiasis.

== Naegleria ==
Although Naegleria is sometimes considered amoeboid, unlike Acanthamoeba or Balamuthia it is not closely related to the Amoebozoa (it is much more closely related to Leishmania) and agents used to treat Naegleria infections are usually addressed separately.

== See also ==
- Anti-protist
