= Dientamoebiasis =

- Specialty: Infectious disease

Dientamoebiasis is a medical condition caused by infection with Dientamoeba fragilis, a single-cell parasite that infects the lower gastrointestinal tract of humans. It is an important cause of traveler's diarrhea, chronic abdominal pain, chronic fatigue, and failure to thrive in children.

== Signs and symptoms ==
The most commonly reported symptoms in conjunction with infection with D. fragilis include abdominal pain (69%) and diarrhea (61%). Diarrhea may be intermittent and may not be present in all cases. It is often chronic, lasting over two weeks. The degree of symptoms may vary from asymptomatic to severe, and can include weight loss, vomiting, fever, and involvement of other digestive organs.

Symptoms may be more severe in children. Additional symptoms reported have included:

1. Weight loss
2. Fatigue
3. Nausea and vomiting
4. Fever
5. Urticaria (skin rash)
6. Pruritus (itchiness)
7. Biliary infection

== Cause ==
=== Genetic diversity ===
As many individuals are asymptomatic carriers of D. fragilis, pathogenic and nonpathogenic variants are proposed to exist. A study of D. fragilis isolates from 60 individuals with symptomatic infection in Sydney, Australia, found all were infected with the same genotype, which is the most common worldwide, but differed from the genotype first described from a North American isolate and later also detected in Europe.

=== Transmission ===
Organisms similar to D. fragilis are known to produce a cyst stage that is able to survive outside the host and facilitate infection of new hosts. However, the exact manner in which it is transmitted is not yet known, as the organism is unable to survive outside its human host for more than a few hours after excretion, and no cyst stage has been found.

Early theories of transmission suggested D. fragilis was unable to produce a cyst stage in infected humans, but some animal existed that in which it did produce a cyst stage, and this animal was responsible for spreading it. However, no such animal has ever been discovered. A later theory suggested the organism was transmitted by pinworms, which provided protection for the parasite outside the host. DNA has been detected in surface-sterilized eggs of Enterobius vermicularis eggs, thus suggesting the latter may harbor the former. Experimental ingestion of pinworm eggs established infection in two investigators. Numerous studies reported high rates of coinfection with helminthes. However, recent study has failed to show any association between D. fragilis infection and pinworm infection. Parasites similar to D. fragilis are transmitted by consuming water or food contaminated with feces. The high rate (40%) of concomitant infection with other protozoa reported by at St. Vincent's Hospital, Sydney, Australia, supports the oral-fecal route of transmission.

== Diagnosis ==
Diagnosis is usually performed by submitting multiple stool samples for examination by a parasitologist in a procedure known as an ova and parasite examination. About 30% of children with D. fragilis infection exhibit peripheral blood eosinophilia.

A minimum of three stool specimens having been immediately fixed in polyvinyl alcohol fixative, sodium acetate-acetic acid-formalin fixative, or Schaudinn's fixative should be submitted, as the protozoan does not remain morphologically identifiable for long. All specimens, regardless of consistency, are permanently stained prior to microscopic examination with an oil immersion lens. The disease may remain cryptic due to the lack of a cyst stage if these recommendations are not followed.

The trophozoite forms have been recovered from formed stool, thus the need to perform the ova and parasite examination on specimens other than liquid or soft stools. DNA fragment analysis provides excellent sensitivity and specificity when compared to microscopy for the detection of D. fragilis and both methods should be employed in laboratories with PCR capability. The most sensitive detection method is parasite culture, and the culture medium requires the addition of rice starch.

An indirect fluorescent antibody (IFA) for fixed stool specimens has been developed.

1. One researcher investigated the phenomenon of symptomatic relapse following treatment of infection with D. fragilis in association with its apparent disappearance from stool samples. The organism could still be detected in patients through colonoscopy or by examining stool samples taken in conjunction with a saline laxative.
2. A study found that trichrome staining, a traditional method for identification, had a sensitivity of 36% (9/25) when compared to stool culture.
3. An additional study found that the sensitivity of staining was 50% (2/4), and that the organism could be successfully cultured in stool specimens up to 12-hours old that were kept at room temperature.

== Treatment ==
Concomitant pinworm infection should also be excluded, although the association has not been proven. Successful treatment of the infection with iodoquinol, doxycycline, metronidazole, paromomycin, and secnidazole has been reported. Resistance requires the use of combination therapy to eradicate the organism. All persons living in the same residence should be screened for D. fragilis, as asymptomatic carriers may provide a source of repeated infection. Paromomycin is an effective prophylactic for travellers who will encounter poor sanitation and unsafe drinking water.

== Epidemiology ==
Rates of infection increase in conditions of crowding and poor sanitation, and are higher in military personnel and mental institutions. The true extent of disease has yet to emerge, as most laboratories do not use techniques to adequately identify this organism. An Australian study identified a large number of patients, considered to have irritable bowel syndrome, who were actually infected with Dientamoeba fragilis.

Although D. fragilis has been described as an infection "emerging from obscurity", it has become one of the most prevalent gastrointestinal infections in industrialized countries, especially among children and young adults. A Canadian study reported a prevalence of around 10% in boys and girls aged 11–15 years, a prevalence of 11.5% in individuals aged 16–20, and a lower incidence of 0.3–1.9% in individuals over age 20.

== History ==
Early microbiologists reported that the organism was not pathogenic, though six of the seven individuals from whom they isolated it were experiencing symptoms of dysentery. Their report, published in 1918, concluded the organism was not pathogenic because it consumed bacteria in culture, but did not appear to engulf red blood cells, as was seen in the best-known disease-causing amoeba of the time, Entamoeba histolytica. This initial report may still be contributing to the reluctance of physicians to diagnose the infection.

== See also ==
- List of parasites (human)
