= Giardiasis =

Parasitic disease that results in diarrhea

- Other names: Beaver fever, giardia
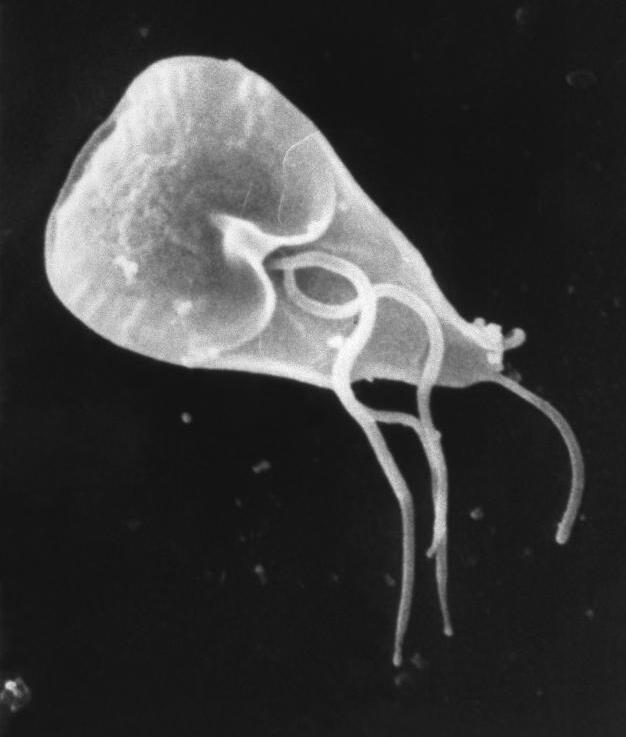
- Giardia cell viewed with scanning electron microscope
- Specialty: Infectious disease, gastroenterology
- Symptoms: Diarrhoea, abdominal pain, weight loss, nausea
- Usual onset: 1 to 3 weeks after exposure
- Causes: Giardia duodenalis spread mainly through contaminated food or water
- Risk factors: Hypogammaglobulinemia
- Diagnostic method: Stool testing
- Differential diagnosis: Irritable bowel syndrome
- Prevention: Improved sanitation
- Treatment: Antiprotozoal medications
- Medication: Tinidazole, metronidazole
- Frequency: Up to 7% (developed world), up to 30% (developing world)

Giardiasis is a parasitic disease caused by the protist enteropathogen Giardia duodenalis (also known as G. lamblia and G. intestinalis), especially common in children and travelers. Infected individuals experience steatorrhea, a type of diarrhea with fatty sticky stool; abdominal pain, weight loss, and weakness due to dehydration and malabsorption. Less common symptoms include skin rash, hives and joint swelling. Symptoms usually begin one to three weeks after exposure and, without treatment, may last two to six weeks or longer. Some infected individuals experience mild or no symptoms and remain symptom-free even if the infection persists for a long time.

Giardiasis spreads via the fecal-oral route, when Giardia cysts excreted with feces contaminate food or water that is later consumed orally. The disease can also spread between people and between people and animals, mainly via pets. Cysts may survive for nearly three months in cold water.

The microscopic identification of Giardia and its cysts in fecal samples is considered the gold standard method for diagnosing giardiasis. Immunoassays, such as ELISA and PCR for giardia gene loci, are also available as diagnostic tools, although are not widely used due to methods complexity and costs.

Prevention may be improved through proper personal hygiene practices and by cooking and sanitizing food. Asymptomatic cases often do not need treatment. When symptoms are present, treatment is typically provided with either tinidazole or metronidazole. Other drugs, such as nitazoxanide, albendazole, quinacrine, chloroquine, paromomycin, and other drug combinations are also used in clinics. Refractory giardiasis and resistant strains are reported more and more often. Infection may cause a person to become lactose intolerant, so it is recommended to temporarily avoid lactose following an infection or use lactase supplements.

Giardiasis occurs worldwide. It is one of the most common parasitic human diseases. Infection rates are as high as 7% in the developed world and 30% in the developing world. In 2013, there were approximately 280 million people worldwide with symptomatic cases of giardiasis. The World Health Organization classifies giardiasis as a neglected disease. It is popularly known as beaver fever in North America.

== Signs and symptoms ==
The signs and symptoms vary from none to severe diarrhoea with poor nutrient absorption. The cause of this wide range in severity of symptoms is not fully known, but the intestinal flora of the infected host may play a role. Diarrhoea is less likely to occur in people from developing countries.

Symptoms typically develop 9–15 days after exposure, but may occur as early as one day. The most common and prominent symptom is chronic diarrhoea, which can occur for weeks or months if untreated. Diarrhoea is often greasy and foul-smelling, with a tendency to float. This characteristic diarrhoea (steatorrhea) is often accompanied by several other symptoms, including gas, abdominal cramps, and nausea or vomiting. Some people also experience symptoms outside of the gastrointestinal tract, such as itchy skin, hives, and swelling of the eyes and joints, although these are less common. Fever occurs in only about 15% of infected people, despite the nickname "beaver fever".

Prolonged disease is often characterised by chronic diarrhoea and malabsorption of nutrients in the intestine. This malabsorption causes fatty stools, substantial weight loss, and fatigue. Additionally, those with giardiasis often have difficulty absorbing lactose, vitamin A, folate, and vitamin B_{12}. In children, prolonged giardiasis can cause failure to thrive and may impair mental development. Symptomatic infections are well recognised as causing lactose intolerance, which, though usually temporary, may become permanent.

== Cause ==
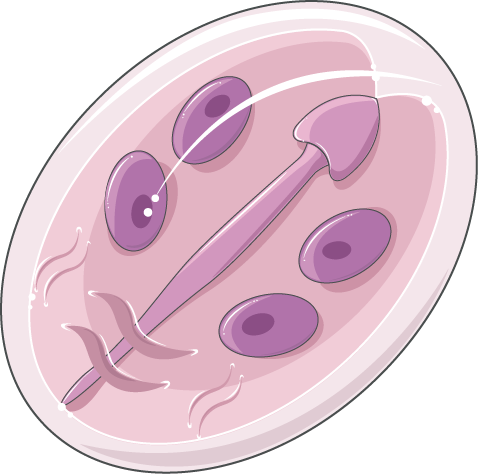
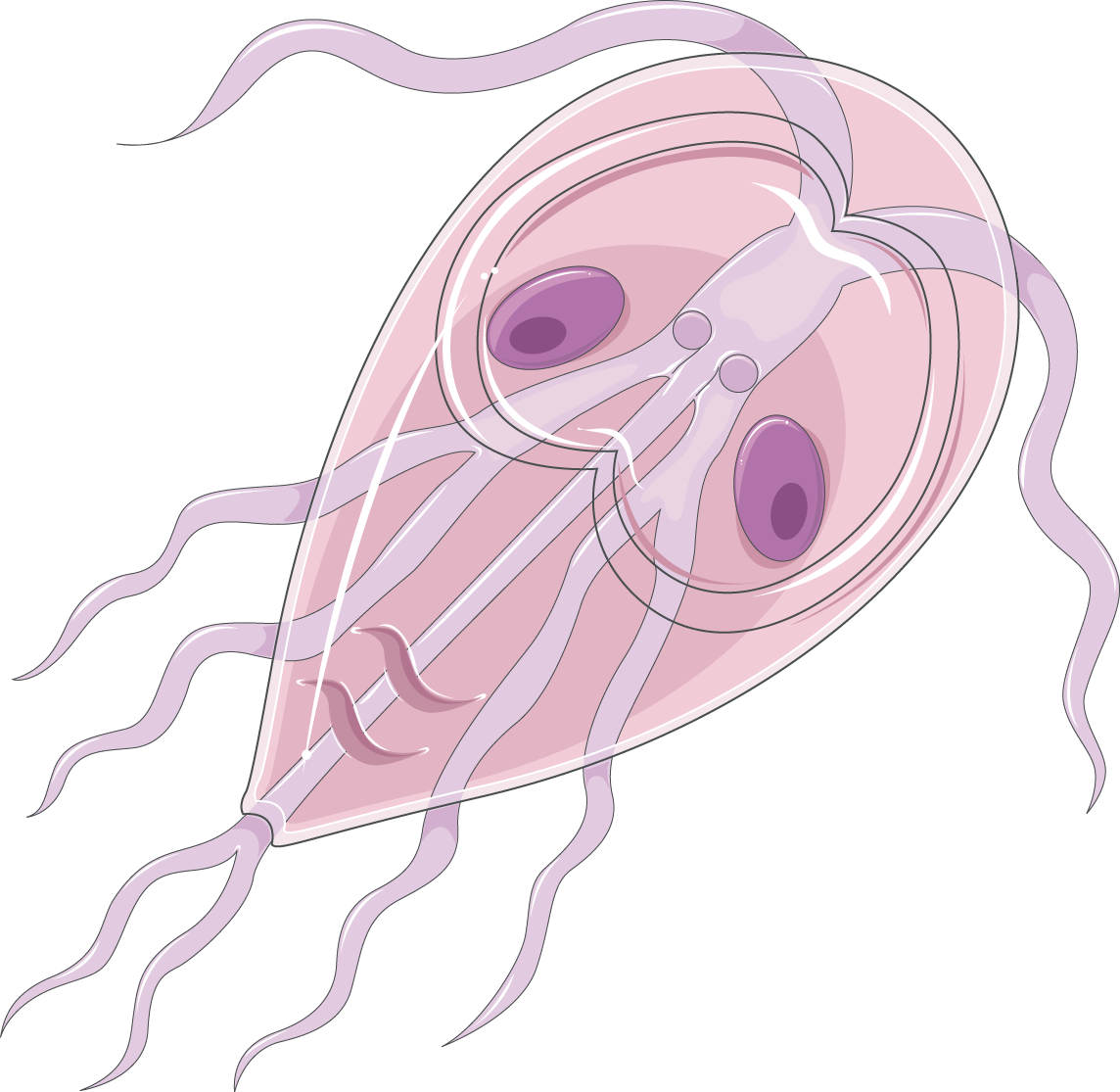
Cyst (left) and trophozoite (right) of Giarda intestinalis

Giardiasis is caused by the protozoan Giardia duodenalis. The infection occurs in many animals, including pets, beavers, other rodents, cows, and sheep. Animals are believed to play a role in keeping infections present in an environment.

G. duodenalis has been sub-classified into eight genetic assemblages (designated A–H). Genotyping of G. duodenalis isolated from various hosts has shown that assemblages A and B infect the largest range of host species, and appear to be the main and possibly only G. duodenalis assemblages that infect humans.

=== Risk factors ===
According to the United States Centers for Disease Control and Prevention (CDC), people at greatest risk of infection are:

- People in childcare settings
- People who are in close contact with someone who has the disease
- Travellers within areas that have poor sanitation
- People who have contact with faeces, such as during sexual activity
- Backpackers or campers who drink untreated water from springs, lakes, or rivers
- Swimmers who swallow water from swimming pools, hot tubs, interactive fountains, or untreated recreational water from springs, lakes, or rivers
- People who get their household water from a shallow well
- People with weakened immune systems
- People who have contact with infected animals or animal environments contaminated with faeces

Factors that increase infection risk for people from developed countries include changing nappies/diapers, consuming raw food, owning a dog, and travelling in the developing world. However, 75% of infections in the United Kingdom are acquired in the UK, not through travel elsewhere. In the United States, giardiasis occurs more often in summer, which is believed to be due to a greater amount of time spent on outdoor activities and travelling in the wilderness.

=== Transmission ===
Giardiasis is transmitted via the faecal-oral route with the ingestion of cysts. Primary routes are personal contact and contaminated water and food. The cysts can stay infectious for up to three months in cold water. Both symptomatic and asymptomatic carriers excrete cysts and thus spread the disease.

== Pathophysiology ==
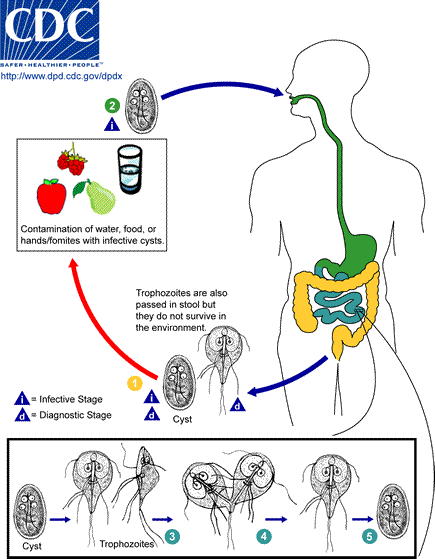
Life cycle of Giardia

The life cycle of Giardia consists of a cyst form and a trophozoite form. The cyst form is infectious and once it has found a host, it transforms into the trophozoite form. This trophozoite attaches to the intestinal wall and replicates within the gut. As trophozoites continue along the gastrointestinal tract, they convert back to their cyst form, which is then excreted with faeces. Ingestion of only a few of these cysts is needed to generate infection in another host.

Infection with Giardia results in decreased expression of brush border enzymes, morphological changes to the microvillus, increased intestinal permeability, and programmed cell death of small intestinal epithelial cells. Both trophozoites and cysts are contained within the gastrointestinal tract and do not invade beyond it.

The attachment of trophozoites causes villous flattening and inhibition of enzymes that break down disaccharide sugars in the intestines. Ultimately, the community of microorganisms that lives in the intestine may overgrow and may be the cause of further symptoms, though this idea has not been fully investigated. The alteration of the villi leads to an inability of nutrient and water absorption from the intestine, resulting in diarrhoea, one of the predominant symptoms. In the case of asymptomatic giardiasis, there can be malabsorption with or without histological changes to the small intestine. The degree to which malabsorption occurs in symptomatic and asymptomatic cases varies greatly.

The species Giardia duodenalis uses enzymes that break down proteins to attack the villi of the brush border and appears to increase crypt cell proliferation and crypt length of crypt cells existing on the sides of the villi. On an immunological level, activated host T lymphocytes attack endothelial cells that have been injured to remove the cells. This occurs after the disruption of proteins that connect brush border endothelial cells to one another. The result is increased intestinal permeability.

There appears to be a further increase in programmed enterocyte cell death by Giardia duodenalis, which further damages the intestinal barrier and increases permeability. There is significant upregulation of the programmed cell death cascade by the parasite, and substantial downregulation of the anti-apoptotic protein Bcl-2 and upregulation of the proapoptotic protein Bax. These connections suggest a role of caspase-dependent apoptosis in the pathogenesis of giardiasis.

Giardia protects its growth by reducing the formation of the gas nitric oxide by consuming all local arginine, which is the amino acid necessary to make nitric oxide. Arginine starvation is known to be a cause of programmed cell death, and local removal is a strong apoptotic agent.

=== Antigenic variation and immune evasion ===
Giardia duodenalis evades host immunity through antigenic variation of its variant-specific surface proteins (VSPs). Giardia's trophozoite genome contains more than 200 VSPs, but only one VSP is displayed on the trophozoite's surface at any given time. RNA interference (RNAi) suppresses all but one VSP mRNA, which results in only one VSP being expressed on the surface of the trophozoite.

When switching occurs the previously expressed VSP disappears and a different VSP mRNA bypasses the RNAi suppressing and results in the expression of the new VSP on the trophozoites surface allowing the parasite to evade immunity.

== Host defence ==
Host defence against Giardia consists of natural barriers, production of nitric oxide, and activation of the innate and adaptive immune systems.

=== Natural barriers ===
Natural barriers defend against the parasite entering the host's body. Natural barriers consist of mucus layers, bile salt, proteases, and lipases. Additionally, peristalsis and the renewal of enterocytes provide further protection against parasites.

=== Nitric oxide production ===
Nitric oxide does not kill the parasite, but it inhibits the growth of trophozoites as well as excystation and encystation.

=== Innate immune system ===
==== Lectin pathway of complement ====
The lectin pathway of complement is activated by mannose-binding lectin (MBL), which binds to N-acetylglucosamine. N-acetylglucosamine is a ligand for MBL and is present on the surface of Giardia.

==== The classical pathway of complement ====
The classical pathway of complement is activated by antibodies specific against Giardia.

=== Adaptive immune system ===
==== Antibodies ====
Antibodies inhibit parasite replication and also induce parasite death via the classical pathway of complement.

Infection with Giardia typically results in a strong antibody response against the parasite. While IgG is made in significant amounts, IgA is believed to be more important in parasite control. IgA is the most abundant isotype in intestinal secretions, and it is also the dominant isotype in a mother's milk. Antibodies in a mother's milk protect children against giardiasis (passive immunisation).

==== T-cells ====
The major aspect of adaptive immune responses is the T-cell response. Giardia is an extracellular pathogen. Therefore, CD4+ helper T-cells are primarily responsible for this protective effect.

One role of helper T-cells is to promote antibody production and isotype switching. Other roles include cytokine production (IL-4, IL-9) to help recruit other effector cells of the immune response.

== Diagnosis ==
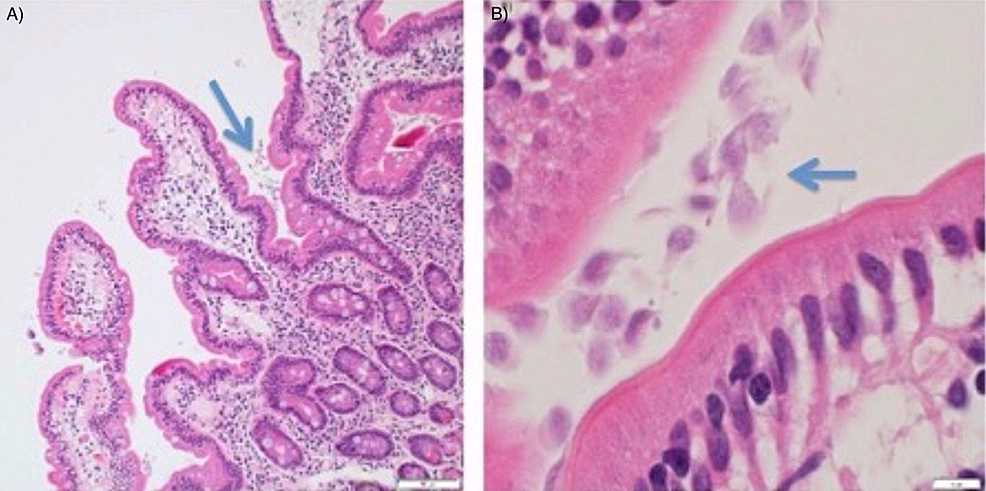
A duodenal biopsy may incidentally detect Giardia organisms, as in this H&E stained sample.

- According to the CDC, the detection of antigens on the surface of organisms in stool specimens is the current test of choice for the diagnosis of giardiasis and provides increased sensitivity over more common microscopy techniques.
- A trichrome stain of preserved stool is another method used to detect Giardia.
- Microscopic examination of the stool can be performed for diagnosis. This method is not preferred, however, due to inconsistent shedding of trophozoites and cysts in infected hosts. Multiple samples over some time, typically one week, must be examined.
- The Entero-Test uses a gelatin capsule with an attached thread. One end is attached to the inner aspect of the host's cheek, and the capsule is swallowed. Later, the thread is withdrawn and shaken in saline to release trophozoites, which can be detected with a microscope. The sensitivity of this test is low, however, and is not routinely used for diagnosis.
- Immunologic enzyme-linked immunosorbent assay (ELISA) testing may be used for diagnosis. These tests are capable of a 90% detection rate or more.

Although hydrogen breath tests indicate poorer rates of carbohydrate absorption in those asymptomatically infected, such tests are not diagnostic of infection. Serological tests are not helpful in diagnosis.

== Prevention ==
The CDC recommends hand-washing and avoiding potentially contaminated food and untreated water.

Boiling water contaminated with Giardia effectively kills infectious cysts. Chemical disinfectants or filters may be used. Iodine-based disinfectants are preferred over chlorination as the latter is ineffective at destroying cysts.

Although the evidence linking the drinking of water in the North American wilderness and giardiasis has been questioned, several studies raise concerns. Most if not all CDC verified backcountry giardiasis outbreaks have been attributed to water. Surveillance data (for 2013 and 2014) reports six outbreaks (96 cases) of waterborne giardiasis contracted from rivers, streams or springs and less than 1% of reported giardiasis cases are associated with outbreaks.

Person-to-person transmission accounts for the majority of Giardia infections and is usually associated with poor hygiene and sanitation. Giardia is often found on the surface of the ground, in the soil, in undercooked foods, and in water, and on hands that have not been properly cleaned after handling infected faeces. Water-borne transmission is associated with the ingestion of contaminated water. In the U.S., outbreaks typically occur in small water systems using inadequately treated surface water. Venereal transmission happens through faecal-oral contamination. Additionally, nappy/diaper changing and inadequate handwashing are risk factors for transmission from infected children. Lastly, food-borne epidemics of Giardia have developed through the contamination of food by infected food handlers.

=== Vaccine ===
There are no vaccines for humans; however, several vaccine candidates are in development. They are targeting: recombinant proteins, DNA vaccines, variant-specific surface proteins (VSP), cyst wall proteins (CWP), giadins, and enzymes. Researchers at CONICET have produced an oral vaccine after engineering customised proteins mimicking those expressed on the surface of Giardia trophozoites. The vaccine has proven effective in mice.

One commercially available vaccine exists – GiardiaVax, made from G. duodenalis whole trophozoite lysate. It is a vaccine for veterinary use only in dogs and cats. GiardiaVax should promote the production of specific antibodies.

== Treatment ==
Treatment is not always necessary as the infection usually resolves on its own. However, if the illness is acute or symptoms persist and medications are needed to treat it, a nitroimidazole medication is used such as metronidazole, tinidazole, secnidazole or ornidazole.

The World Health Organisation and Infectious Disease Society of America recommend metronidazole as first-line therapy. The US CDC lists metronidazole, tinidazole, and nitazoxanide as effective first-line therapies; of these three, only nitazoxanide and tinidazole are approved for the treatment of giardiasis by the US FDA. A meta-analysis published by the Cochrane Collaboration in 2012 found that compared to the standard of metronidazole, albendazole had equivalent efficacy while having fewer side effects, such as gastrointestinal or neurologic issues. Other meta-analyses have reached similar conclusions. Both medications need a five to ten-day-long course; albendazole is taken once a day, while metronidazole needs to be taken three times a day. The evidence for comparing metronidazole to other alternatives such as mebendazole, tinidazole, or nitazoxanide was felt to be of very low quality. While tinidazole has side effects and efficacy similar to those of metronidazole, it is administered with a single dose.

Resistance has been observed clinically to both nitroimidazoles and albendazole, but not nitazoxanide, though nitazoxanide resistance has been induced in research laboratories. The exact mechanism of resistance to all of these medications is not well understood. In the case of nitroimidazole-resistant strains of Giardia, other drugs are available which have shown efficacy in treatment including quinacrine, nitazoxanide, bacitracin zinc, furazolidone and paromomycin. Mepacrine may also be used for refractory cases.

Probiotics, when given in combination with the standard treatment, have been shown to assist with clearance of Giardia.

During pregnancy, paromomycin is the preferred treatment drug because of its poor intestinal absorption, resulting in less exposure to the foetus. Alternatively, metronidazole can be used after the first trimester as there has been wide experience in its use for trichomonas in pregnancy.

== Prognosis ==
In people with a properly functioning immune system, infection may resolve without medication. A small portion, however, develop a chronic infection. People with an impaired immune system are at higher risk of chronic infection. Medication is an effective cure for nearly all people, although there is growing drug resistance.

Children with chronic giardiasis are at risk for failure to thrive as well as more long-lasting sequelae such as growth stunting. Up to half of infected people develop a temporary lactose intolerance leading to symptoms that may mimic a chronic infection. Some people experience post-infectious irritable bowel syndrome after the infection has cleared. Giardiasis has also been implicated in the development of food allergies. This is thought to be due to its effect on intestinal permeability.

== Epidemiology ==
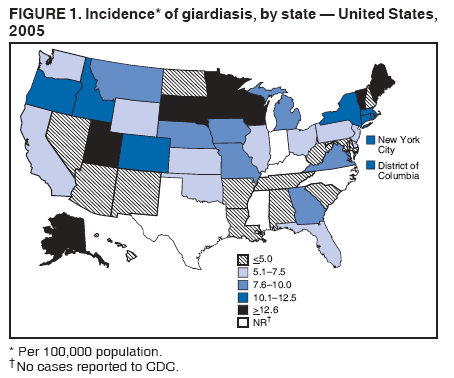
Rates of giardiasis in 2005 in the United States

In some developing countries Giardia is present in 30% of the population. In the United States it is estimated that it is present in 3–7% of the population. Giardiasis is associated with impaired growth and development in children, particularly influencing a country's economic growth by affecting Disability Adjusted Life Year (DALY) rates. Transmission is common in areas with inadequate sanitation and restricted access to clean water, primarily affecting children with low access to resources.

The number of reported cases in the United States in 2018 was 15,584. All states that classify giardiasis as a notifiable disease had cases of giardiasis. The states of Illinois, Kentucky, Mississippi, North Carolina, Oklahoma, Tennessee, Texas, and Vermont did not notify the Centers for Disease Control and Prevention regarding cases in 2018. There are seasonal trends associated with giardiasis. July, August, and September are the months with the highest incidence of giardiasis in the United States.

In the ECDC's (European Centre for Disease Prevention and Control) annual epidemiological report containing 2014 data, 17,278 confirmed giardiasis cases were reported by 23 of the 31 countries that are members of the EU/EEA. Germany reported the highest number at 4,011 cases. Following Germany, the UK reported 3,628 confirmed giardiasis cases. Together, this accounts for 44% of total reported cases.

== Research ==
Some intestinal parasitic infections may play a role in irritable bowel syndrome and other long-term sequelae such as chronic fatigue. The mechanism of transformation from cyst to trophozoites has not been characterised but may help develop drug targets for treatment-resistant Giardia. The interaction between Giardia and host immunity, internal flora, and other pathogens is not well understood.In vitro cell cultures have been widely used to study host-parasite interactions, and human enteroids are now being used as non-transformed intestinal epithelial cell infection models for G. duodenalis and other pathogens.

The main congress about giardiasis is the "International Giardia and Cryptosporidium Conference" (IGCC). A summary of results presented at the most recent edition (2019, in Rouen, France) is available.

== Other animals ==
In both cats and dogs, giardiasis usually responds to metronidazole and fenbendazole. Metronidazole in pregnant cats can cause developmental malformations. Many cats dislike the taste of fenbendazole. Giardiasis has been shown to decrease weight in livestock.

== One Health Perspective ==
Giardiasis is an example of a One Health issue that reflects the interconnected relationship between humans, animals, and environmental health. Giardia duodenalis is a parasite that affects several hosts including humans, domestic animals, and wildlife. Environmental contamination occurs through infected animals' fecal shedding of cysts, which may persist in water and soil for long periods of time. Agricultural runoff and hazardous sanitation measures are major routes of transmission that contaminate water sources. This creates a problem that can be approached by integrating the use of public health, veterinary medicine, and environmental management to prevent and control the spread of giardiasis.
