= Antiprotozoal =

Class of pharmaceuticals used to treat protozoan infections

Antiprotozoal agents (ATC code: ATC P01) is a class of pharmaceuticals used in treatment of protozoan infection.

A paraphyletic group, protozoans have little in common with each other. For example, Entamoeba histolytica, a unikont eukaryotic organism, is more closely related to Homo sapiens (humans), which also belongs to the unikont phylogenetic group, than it is to Naegleria fowleri, a "protozoan" bikont. As a result, agents effective against one pathogen may not be effective against another.

Antiprotozoal agents can be grouped by mechanism or by organism. Recent papers have also proposed the use of viruses to treat infections caused by protozoa.

Overuse or misuse of antiprotozoals can lead to the development of antiprotozoal resistance.

== Medical uses ==
Antiprotozoals are used to treat protozoal infections, which include amebiasis, giardiasis, cryptosporidiosis, microsporidiosis, malaria, babesiosis, trypanosomiasis, Chagas disease, leishmaniasis, and toxoplasmosis. Currently, many of the treatments for these infections are limited by their toxicity.

== Outdated terminology ==
Protists were once considered protozoans, but of late the categorization of unicellar organisms has undergone rapid development. However in literature, including scientific, the term antiprotozoal persists in place of anti-protist. Protists are a supercategory of eukaryota which includes protozoa.

== Mechanism ==
The mechanisms of antiprotozoal drugs differ significantly drug to drug. For example, it appears that eflornithine, a drug used to treat trypanosomiasis, inhibits ornithine decarboxylase, while the aminoglycoside antibiotic/antiprotozoals used to treat leishmaniasis are thought to inhibit protein synthesis.

== Examples ==
- Eflornithine
- Furazolidone
- Hydroxychloroquine
- Melarsoprol
- Metronidazole
- Nifursemizone
- Nitazoxanide
- Ornidazole
- Paromomycin sulfate
- Pentamidine
- Pyrimethamine
- Quinapyramine
- Ronidazole
- Tinidazole
