= Streptomyces chrestomyceticus =

Scientific classification
- Domain: Bacteria
- Kingdom: Bacillati
- Phylum: Actinomycetota
- Class: Actinomycetes
- Order: Streptomycetales
- Family: Streptomycetaceae
- Genus: Streptomyces
- Species: S. chrestomyceticus

Binomial name
- Streptomyces chrestomyceticus Canevazzi and Scotti 1959

Type strain
- AS 4.1657, ATCC 14947, BCRC 12173, CBS 745.72, CCRC 12173, CGMCC 4.1657, CMI 79589, DSM 40545, DSM 40820, IFO 13444, IMRU 3835, ISP 5545, JCM 4735, KCC S-0735, KCCS-0735, MTCC 6922, NBRC 13444, NCAIM B.01478, NCIB 8995, NCIMB 10999, NCIMB 8995, NRRL B-3293, NRRL B-3310, NRRL B-3672, NRRL-ISP 5545, RIA 1405, Waksman 3835

Species of bacterium

Streptomyces chrestomyceticus is a bacterium species from the genus of Streptomyces. Streptomyces chrestomyceticus produces lycopene, pyrrolostatin, paromomycin, aminocidin, aminosidin, neomycin E and neomycin F.

== See also ==
- List of Streptomyces species
