= Hydroxymetronidazole =

Names
- Preferred IUPAC name 2-[2-(Hydroxymethyl)-5-nitro-1H-imidazol-1-yl]ethan-1-ol
- Other names Metronidazole-OH; 1-(2-Hydroxyethyl)-2-hydroxymethyl-5-nitroimidazole

Identifiers
CAS Number	4812-40-2
3D model (JSmol)	Interactive image
Abbreviations	MNZOH
ChemSpider	108713
ECHA InfoCard	100.169.434
PubChem CID	121858
UNII	7RUI9488IL
CompTox Dashboard (EPA)	DTXSID20197426
- InChI: InChI=1S/C6H9N3O4/c10-2-1-8-5(4-11)7-3-6(8)9(12)13/h3,10-11H,1-2,4H2 Key: AEHPOYAOLCAMIU-UHFFFAOYSA-N; InChI=1/C6H9N3O4/c10-2-1-8-5(4-11)7-3-6(8)9(12)13/h3,10-11H,1-2,4H2 Key: AEHPOYAOLCAMIU-UHFFFAOYAK
- SMILES: C1=C(N(C(=N1)CO)CCO)[N+](=O)[O-]

Properties
Chemical formula	C_{6}H_{9}N_{3}O_{4}
Molar mass	187.15 g/mol
- Except where otherwise noted, data are given for materials in their standard state (at 25 °C [77 °F], 100 kPa). verify (what is ?) Infobox references

Hydroxymetronidazole is the main metabolite of metronidazole. Both have antibiotic and antiprotozoal activity.
