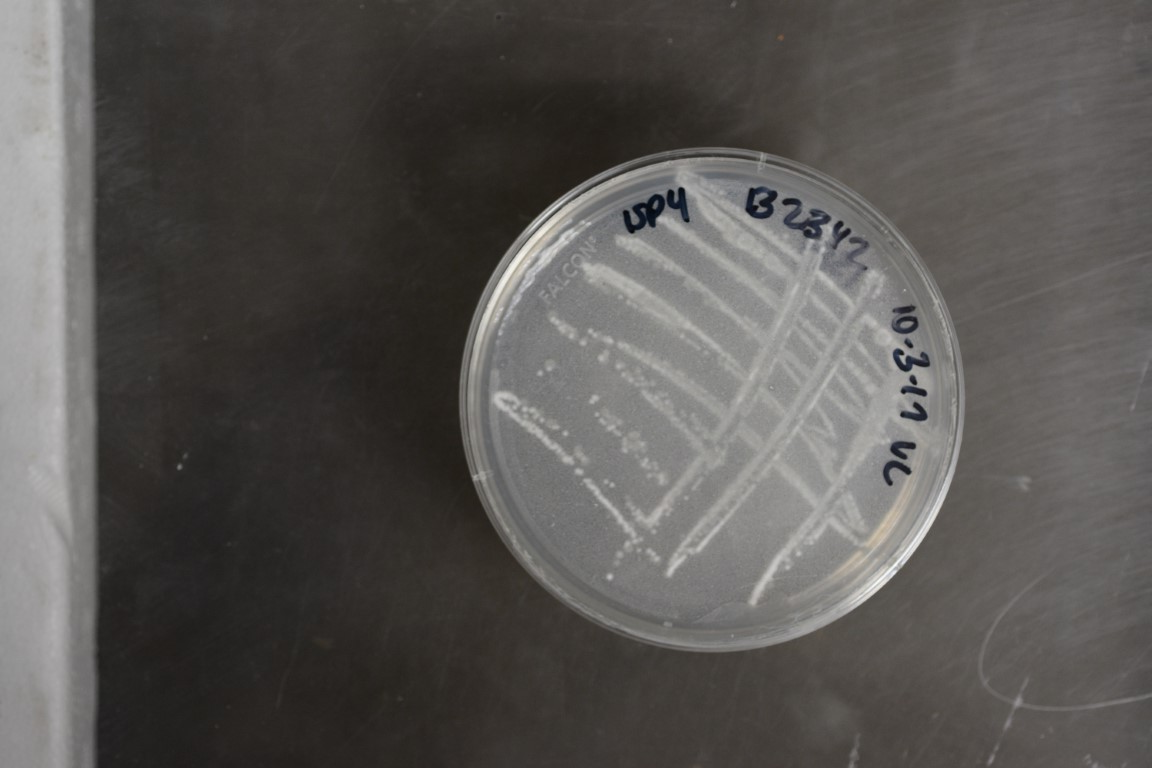

Scientific classification
- Domain: Bacteria
- Kingdom: Bacillati
- Phylum: Actinomycetota
- Class: Actinomycetes
- Order: Streptomycetales
- Family: Streptomycetaceae
- Genus: Streptomyces
- Species: S. catenulae

Binomial name
- Streptomyces catenulae Davisson and Finlay 1961

Type strain
- 5541-6A, AS 4.1701, ATCC 12476, ATCC 23893, BCRC 12092, CBS 679.68, CCRC 12092, DSM 40258, ETH 24422, HAMBI 986, IFO 12848, IMET 42944, ISP 5258, JCM 4353, KCC S-0353, KCTC 9223, NBRC 12848, NRRL B-2342, NRRL-ISP 5258, Pfizer 5541-GA, Pfizer 6563, RIA 1183, VKM Ac-758

= Streptomyces catenulae =

Species of bacterium

Streptomyces catenulae is a bacterium species from the genus of Streptomyces. Streptomyces catenulae produces paromomycin, catenulin, N-isobutyrylpepstatin neomycin E, neomycin F, 2-amini-3-butynoic acid, and pepsinostreptin.

== See also ==
- List of Streptomyces species
