= Pyrrolostatin =

Names
- IUPAC name 4-[(2E)-3,7-Dimethylocta-2,6-dienyl]-1H-pyrrole-2-carboxylic acid

Identifiers
CAS Number	144314-68-1
3D model (JSmol)	Interactive image
ChemSpider	4510256
PubChem CID	5353914
- InChI: InChI=1S/C15H21NO2/c1-11(2)5-4-6-12(3)7-8-13-9-14(15(17)18)16-10-13/h5,7,9-10,16H,4,6,8H2,1-3H3,(H,17,18)/b12-7+ Key: UEQIBCOZMSTCSW-KPKJPENVSA-N
- SMILES: CC(=CCC/C(=C/CC1=CNC(=C1)C(=O)O)/C)C

Properties
Chemical formula	C_{15}H_{21}NO_{2}
Molar mass	247.338 g·mol^{−1}
- Except where otherwise noted, data are given for materials in their standard state (at 25 °C [77 °F], 100 kPa). Infobox references

Pyrrolostatin is a lipid peroxidation inhibitor with the molecular formula C_{15}H_{21}NO_{2} which has been isolated from the bacterium Streptomyces chrestomyceticus.
