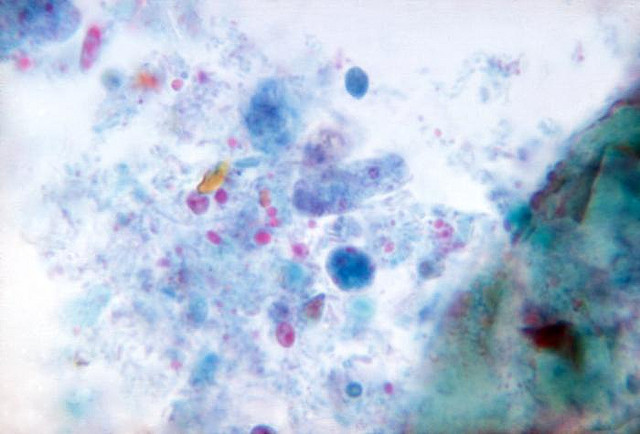

Scientific classification
- Domain: Eukaryota
- Supergroup: Metamonada
- Phylum: Parabasalia
- Class: Dientamoebea
- Order: Dientamoebida
- Family: Dientamoebidae
- Genus: Dientamoeba; Jepps & Dobell, 1918
- Species: D. fragilis

Binomial name
- Dientamoeba fragilis Jepps & Dobell, 1918

= Dientamoeba =

Parasite of humans, pigs and gorillas

Dientamoeba fragilis is a species of single-celled excavates found in the gastrointestinal tract of some humans, pigs and gorillas. It is the only species in the genus Dientamoeba. It causes gastrointestinal upset in some people, but not in others. It is an important cause of traveller's diarrhoea, chronic diarrhoea, fatigue and, in children, failure to thrive. Despite this, its role as a "commensal, pathobiont, or pathogen" is still debated. D. fragilis is one of the smaller parasites that are able to live in the human intestine. Dientamoeba fragilis cells are able to survive and move in fresh feces but are sensitive to aerobic environments. They dissociate when in contact or placed in saline, tap water or distilled water.

== Etymology ==
- Di refers to the two nuclei in the trophozoites (feeding stage of the organism).
- Ent refers to the enteric environment in which the organism is found.
- The species name fragilis refers to the fact that the trophozoite stages are fragile; they do not survive long in the stool after leaving the body of the human host.

It was first described in 1918.

== Dientamoebiasis ==
There is continuous debate on whether D. fragilis should be considered to be a harmless organism or a pathogenic parasite. Infection with D. fragilis, called dientamoebiasis, is associated variously with symptoms of abdominal pain, diarrhea, weight loss, nausea, fatigue and fever. In one study, D. fragilis was identified in 0.9% of patients observed. Its coincidence with enterobiasis, caused by pinworm (Enterobius vermicularis), has been reported. In another study, eosinophilia was present in half of the infected children participating in the case. D. fragilis does not penetrate the host tissue directly; therefore, some of these symptoms may be caused from irritation which then leads to colonic motility. Infection can occur at any age; however, the most common ages that have been reported are children 5–10 years old.

== Diagnosis ==
In order to diagnose the parasite, patients are required to provide (multiple) fresh stool samples that have been preserved for parasite examination. The multiple samples are required because of parasite detection being difficult, therefore, a sample might be obtained each day to help increase the sensitivity. Patients can also be tested for E. vermicularis since the two parasites are known to coincide.

== Treatment ==
Once diagnosed, E. vermicularis is also searched for throughout the body. The age and clinical status of the patient will determine the treatment given. If the patient is a child, a temporary treatment would be offered to test if symptoms can be alleviated, otherwise, another diagnosis and treatment are required. If the child is asymptomatic, then treatment is not necessary. Iodoquinol is the primary drug treatment for dientamoebiasis, but there are side effects such as abdominal cramping, nausea, and rash. There are other medications that treat dientamoebiasis, including paromomycin and metronidazole. Tetracycline and doxycycline have also been used as a form of treatment. Drugs such as secnidazole and ornidazole have been used as well, but are not available in the United States.

== Epidemiology ==
Dientamoeba fragilis has an estimated prevalence throughout the United States. Unlike majority of parasitic infections, D. fragilis is more prevalent in well-developed countries as opposed to disadvantaged and resource poor nations. The parasite is also endemic in crowded communities (i.e institutions), populations with unsatisfactory sanitation conditions, and individuals who travel to underprivileged countries. Globally, the prevalence of D. fragilis ranges from 0.3% to 90%, occurring in multiple countries including many urbanized cities such as Los Angeles, California and Sydney, Australia. Recently, D. fragilis was considered to be more prevalent than Giardia, thus leading to better diagnostics.

== Phylogenetics ==
Dientamoeba fragilis is a type of trichomonad. Trichomonads are flagellated organisms but D. fragilis lacks flagella, having secondarily lost them over evolutionary time. Thus, it is an amoeba of flagellate ancestry. In point of ultrastructural and antigenic view, Dientamoeba is reclassified as a flagellate.

The lifecycle of this parasite has not yet been completely determined, but some assumptions have been made based on clinical data. A cyst stage has been reported, although it is yet to be independently confirmed (as of 2013). If true, D. fragilis is probably transmitted by the fecal-oral route. Prior to the report of this cyst stage in the lifecycle of Dientamoeba, transmission was postulated to occur by helminth eggs (e.g., Ascaris, Enterobius spp.). The rationale for this suggestion was that D. fragilis is closely related to the turkey parasite Histomonas, which is known to be transmitted by the eggs of the helminth Heterakis. Since D. fragilis is known to frequently coinfect with E. vermicularis, this leads to the assumption that E. vermicularis is a possible vector and mode of transmission.

When inside the host, the parasite infects the mucosal crypts of the large intestine. They primarily affect the cecum and proximal colon. It is assumed that when D. fragilis is inside the colon, it reproduces asexually by binary fission. From there, the trophozoites are in the lumen of the colon, and are excreted as wastes. D. fragilis is not considered to be invasive nor cause cell or tissue damage.

== Build ==
Dientamoeba fragilis replicates by binary fission, moves by pseudopodia, and feeds by phagocytosis. The cytoplasm typically contains numerous food vacuoles that contain ingested debris, including bacteria. Waste materials are eliminated from the cell through digestive vacuoles by exocytosis. D. fragilis possesses some flagellate characteristics. In the binucleated form is a spindle structure located between the nuclei, which stems from certain polar configurations adjacent to a nucleus; these configurations appear to be homologous to hypermastigotes’ atractophores. A complex Golgi apparatus is seen; the nuclear structure of D. fragilis is more similar to that of flagellated trichomonads than to that of Entamoeba. Also notable is the presence of hydrogenosomes, which are also a characteristic of other trichomonads.

== See also ==
- List of parasites (human)
