= Trichomoniasis =

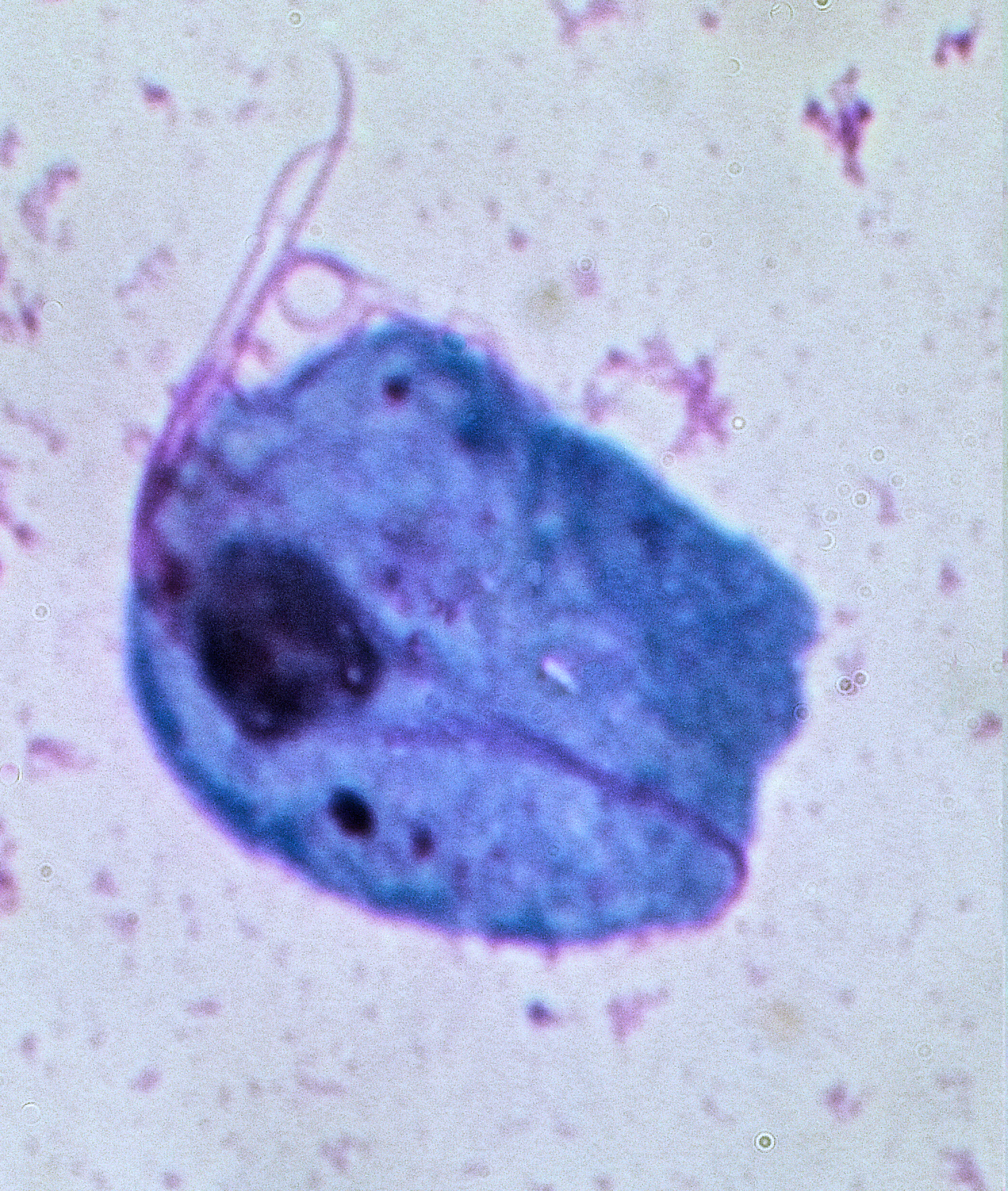
- Micrograph showing Trichomonas vaginalis using May-Grünwald staining
- Specialty: Gynecology Microbiology Infectious diseases
- Symptoms: Itching in the genital area, yellow-green bad smelling thin vaginal discharge, burning with urination, pain with sex
- Usual onset: 5 to 28 days after exposure
- Causes: Trichomonas vaginalis (typically sexually transmitted)
- Diagnostic method: Finding the parasite in vaginal fluid, microbial culture, testing for the parasites DNA
- Prevention: Using condoms, not having sex, not douching
- Medication: Antibiotics (metronidazole or tinidazole)
- Frequency: 122 million (2015)

Trichomoniasis (trich) is an infectious disease caused by the parasite Trichomonas vaginalis. About 70% of affected people do not have symptoms when infected. When symptoms occur, they typically begin 5 to 28 days after exposure. Symptoms can include itching in the genital area, a bad smelling thin vaginal discharge, burning with urination, and pain with sex. Having trichomoniasis increases the risk of getting HIV/AIDS. It may also cause complications during pregnancy.

Trichomoniasis is a sexually transmitted infection (STI) most often spread by vaginal, oral, or anal sex. It can also spread through genital touching (manual sex). Infected people may spread the disease even when symptoms are absent. Diagnosis is by finding the parasite in the vaginal fluid using a microscope, culturing the vaginal fluid or urine, or testing for the parasite's DNA. If present, other STIs should be tested for.

Methods of prevention include not having sex, using condoms, not douching, and being tested for STIs before having sex with a new partner. Although not caused by a bacterium, trichomoniasis can be cured with certain antibiotics (metronidazole, tinidazole, secnidazole). Sexual partners should also be treated. About 20% of people get infected again within three months of treatment.

There were about 122 million new cases of trichomoniasis in 2015. In the United States, about 2 million women are affected. It occurs more often in women than men. Trichomonas vaginalis was first identified in 1836 by Alfred Donné. It was first recognized as causing this disease in 1916.

== Signs and symptoms ==
A single trichomonas by phase contrast microscopy

Most people infected with Trichomonas vaginalis do not have any symptoms and it can be undetected for years. Symptoms include pain, burning or itching in the penis, urethra (urethritis), or vagina (vaginitis). Discomfort for both sexes may increase during intercourse and urination. For women, there may also be a yellow-green, itchy, frothy, foul-smelling ("fishy" smell) vaginal discharge. In rare cases, lower abdominal pain can occur. Symptoms usually appear within 5 to 28 days of exposure. Sometimes trichomoniasis can be confused with chlamydia because the symptoms are similar.

=== Complications ===
Trichomoniasis is linked to several serious complications.

- Trichomoniasis is associated with an increased risk of transmission and infection of HIV.
- Trichomoniasis may cause a woman to deliver a low-birth-weight or premature infant.
- The role of Trichomonas infection in causing cervical cancer is unclear. However, trichomonas infection may be associated with co-infection with high-risk strains of HPV.
- T. vaginalis infection in males has been found to cause asymptomatic urethritis and prostatitis. In the prostate, it may create chronic inflammation that may eventually lead to prostate cancer.

== Causes ==
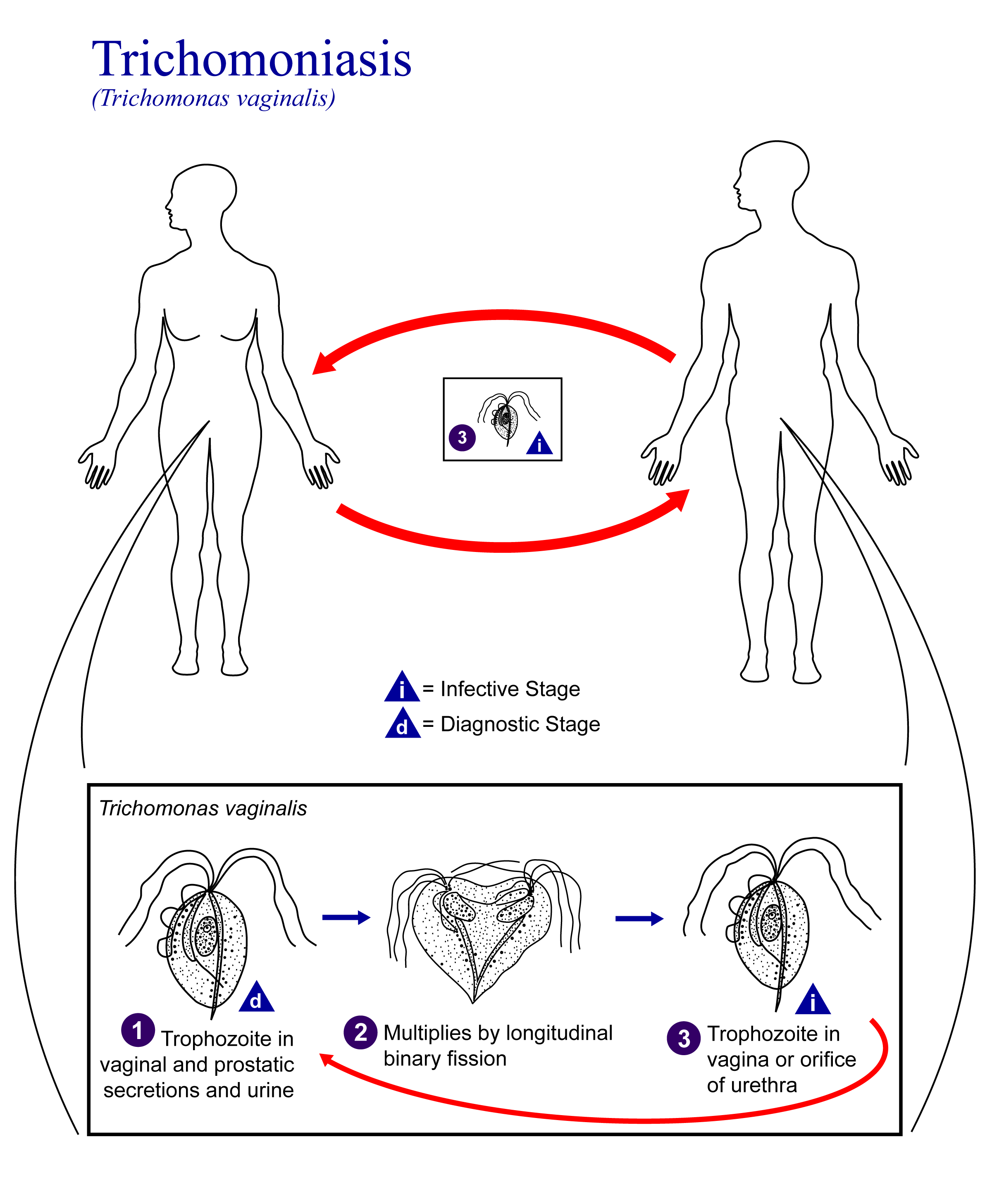
Lifecycle of Trichomonas

The human genital tract is the only reservoir for this species. Trichomonas is transmitted through sexual or genital contact.

The single-celled protozoan produces mechanical stress on host cells and then ingests cell fragments after cell death.

=== Genetic sequence ===
A draft sequence of the Trichomonas genome was published on January 12, 2007, in the journal Science, confirming that the genome has at least 26,000 genes, a similar number to the human genome. An additional approximately 34,000 unconfirmed genes, including thousands that are part of potentially transposable elements, brings the gene content to well over 60,000.

== Diagnosis ==
Micrograph of a Pap test showing trichomoniasis as oval-to-pear-shaped Trichomonas vaginalis organisms with cyanophilic, granular cytoplasm and faint eccentric nuclei.

There are three main ways to test for trichomoniasis.

- The first is known as saline microscopy. This is the most commonly used method and requires an endocervical, vaginal, or penile swab specimen for examination under a microscope. The presence of one or multiple trichomonads constitutes a positive result. This method is cheap but has a low sensitivity (60–70%) often due to an inadequate sample, resulting in false negatives.
- The second diagnostic method is culture, which has historically been the "gold standard" in infectious disease diagnosis. Trichomonas vaginalis culture tests are relatively cheap but their sensitivity is still somewhat low (70–89%).
- The third method includes the nucleic acid amplification tests (NAATs), which are more sensitive. These tests are more costly than microscopy and culture, and are highly sensitive (80–90%).

== Prevention ==
Use of male condoms or female condoms may help prevent the spread of trichomoniasis, although careful studies have never been done on how to prevent this infection. Infection with trichomoniasis through water is unlikely because Trichomonas vaginalis dies in water after 45–60 minutes, in thermal water after 30 minutes to 3 hours, and in diluted urine after 5–6 hours.

There are no routine standard screening requirements for the general U.S. population receiving family planning or STI testing. The Centers for Disease Control and Prevention (CDC) recommends trichomoniasis testing for females with vaginal discharge and can be considered for females at higher risk for infection or of HIV-positive serostatus.

New, highly specific, and sensitive trichomoniasis testing methods may allow for new screening protocols for both men and women. Careful planning, discussion, and research are required to determine the cost-efficiency and most beneficial use of these new tests for the diagnosis and treatment of trichomoniasis, which can lead to better prevention efforts.

Several strategies have been found to improve follow-up for STI testing, including email and text messaging as reminders of appointments.

=== Screening ===
Evidence from randomized controlled trials for screening pregnant women who have no symptoms of infection with trichomoniasis and treating women who test positive for the infection have not consistently shown a reduced risk of preterm birth. Further studies are needed to verify this result and determine the best method of screening. In the U.S., screening of pregnant women without symptoms is recommended only for those with HIV, as Trichomonas infection is associated with an increased risk of transmitting HIV to the fetus.

== Treatment ==
Treatment for both pregnant and non-pregnant women is usually with metronidazole, by mouth once. Caution should be used in pregnancy, especially in the first trimester. Sexual partners, even if they have no symptoms, should also be treated. Single oral dose of nitroimidazole is sufficient to kill the parasites.

For 95–97% of cases, infection is resolved after one dose of metronidazole. Studies suggest that 4–5% of trichomonas cases are resistant to metronidazole, which may account for some "repeat" cases. Without treatment, trichomoniasis can persist for months to years in women, and is thought to improve without treatment in men. Women living with HIV infection have better cure rates if treated for seven days rather than with one dose.

Topical treatments are less effective than oral antibiotics due to Skene's gland and other genitourinary structures acting as reservoirs.

Vaginal boric acid can be useful against resistant trichomoniasis.

== Epidemiology ==
There were about 58 million cases of trichomoniasis in 2013. It is more common in females (2.7%) than males (1.4%). It is the most common non-viral STI in the U.S., with an estimated 3.7 million prevalent cases and 1.1 million new cases per year. It is estimated that 3% of the general U.S. population is infected, and 7.5–32% of moderate-to-high risk (including incarcerated) populations.

== See also ==
- Trichomonas gallinae is a related pathogen of birds
