= Anti-protist =

Anti-protist or antiprotistal refers to an anti-parasitic and anti-infective agent which is active against protists. Unfortunately due to the long ingrained usage of the term antiprotozoal, the two terms are confused, when in fact protists are a supercategory. Therefore, there are protists that are not protozoans. Beyond "animal-like" (heterotrophic, including parasitic) protozoans, protists also include the "plant-like" (autotrophic) protophyta and the "fungi-like" saprophytic molds. In current biology, the concept of a "protist" and its three subdivisions has been replaced.

== See also ==
- Amebicide
