= Fenticonazole nitrate/lidocaine/tinidazole =

Combination of
- Fenticonazole nitrate: Antifungal
- Lidocaine: Local anesthetic
- Tinidazole: Antibiotic

Clinical data
- Trade names: Evegyn
- Routes of administration: Vaginal

Fenticonazole nitrate/lidocaine/tinidazole, tentative brand name Evegyn, is a combination of the antibiotic tinidazole, the antifungal fenticonazole, and the local anesthetic lidocaine which is under development for the treatment of bacterial vaginosis, vulvovaginal candidiasis, and vaginitis. It is taken by vaginal administration. The drug is being developed by Exeltis Turkey and is being developed towards approval specifically in Turkey. As of February 2025, it is in phase 3 clinical trials for all indications.
