= Ornidazole =

Chemical compound

Clinical data
- Trade names: Xynor
- AHFS/Drugs.com: International Drug Names
- Routes of administration: Oral
- ATC code: G01AF06 (WHO) J01XD03 (WHO) P01AB03 (WHO) QP51AA03 (WHO)

Pharmacokinetic data
- Metabolism: Via liver
- Elimination half-life: 12-13 hours
- Excretion: Urine (63%) and Feces (22%)

Identifiers
- IUPAC name: 1-Chloro-3-(2-methyl-5-nitro-1H-imidazol-1-yl)propan-2-ol
- CAS Number: 16773-42-5
- PubChem CID: 28061
- DrugBank: DB13026
- ChemSpider: 26102
- UNII: 62XCK0G93T
- KEGG: D05274
- ChEBI: CHEBI:75176
- ChEMBL: ChEMBL1449676
- CompTox Dashboard (EPA): DTXSID4045420
- ECHA InfoCard: 100.037.099

Chemical and physical data
- Formula: C_{7}H_{10}ClN_{3}O_{3}
- Molar mass: 219.63 g·mol^{−1}
- 3D model (JSmol): Interactive image
- SMILES: [O-][N+](=O)c1cnc(n1CC(O)CCl)C
- InChI: InChI=1S/C7H10ClN3O3/c1-5-9-3-7(11(13)14)10(5)4-6(12)2-8/h3,6,12H,2,4H2,1H3; Key:IPWKIXLWTCNBKN-UHFFFAOYSA-N

Ornidazole is an antibiotic used to treat protozoan infections. A synthetic nitroimidazole, it is commercially obtained from an acid-catalyzed reaction between 2-methyl-5-nitroimidazole and epichlorohydrin. Ornidazole is nothing but chloro-secnidazole.

Antimicrobial spectrum is similar to that of metronidazole and is more well tolerated; however there are concerns of lower relative efficacy.

It was first introduced for treating trichomoniasis before being recognized for its broad anti-protozoan and anti-anaerobic-bacterial capacities. has also been investigated for use in Crohn's disease after bowel resection.
