= Secnidazole =

Chemical compound

Clinical data
- Trade names: Solosec
- Other names: PM-185184; RP-14539; SYM-1219
- AHFS/Drugs.com: International Drug Names
- License data: US DailyMed: Secnidazole
- Routes of administration: Oral
- ATC code: P01AB07 (WHO)

Legal status
- Legal status: US: ℞-only

Identifiers
- IUPAC name: 1-(2-Methyl-5-nitro-1H-imidazol-1-yl)propan-2-ol
- CAS Number: 3366-95-8
- PubChem CID: 71815
- ChemSpider: 64839
- UNII: R3459K699K
- KEGG: D07353
- ChEBI: CHEBI:140628
- ChEMBL: ChEMBL498847
- CompTox Dashboard (EPA): DTXSID3045934
- ECHA InfoCard: 100.020.123

Chemical and physical data
- Formula: C_{7}H_{11}N_{3}O_{3}
- Molar mass: 185.183 g·mol^{−1}
- 3D model (JSmol): Interactive image
- SMILES: [O-][N+](=O)c1cnc(n1CC(O)C)C
- InChI: InChI=1S/C7H11N3O3/c1-5(11)4-9-6(2)8-3-7(9)10(12)13/h3,5,11H,4H2,1-2H3; Key:KPQZUUQMTUIKBP-UHFFFAOYSA-N

Secnidazole (trade names Flagentyl, Sindose, Secnil, Solosec) is a nitroimidazole anti-infective used to treat bacterial vaginosis and trichomoniasis. It is taken orally.

Structurally it actually methyl-metronidazole. Effectiveness in the treatment of dientamoebiasis has been reported. It has also been tested against Atopobium vaginae.

In the United States, secnidazole is FDA-approved for the treatment of bacterial vaginosis and trichomoniasis in adult women. It was approved in the United States in 2017.
