= Diiodohydroxyquinoline =

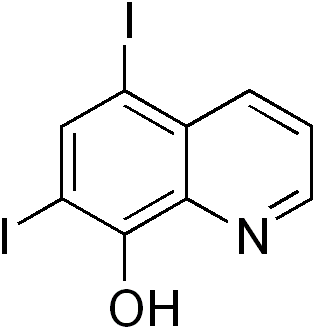

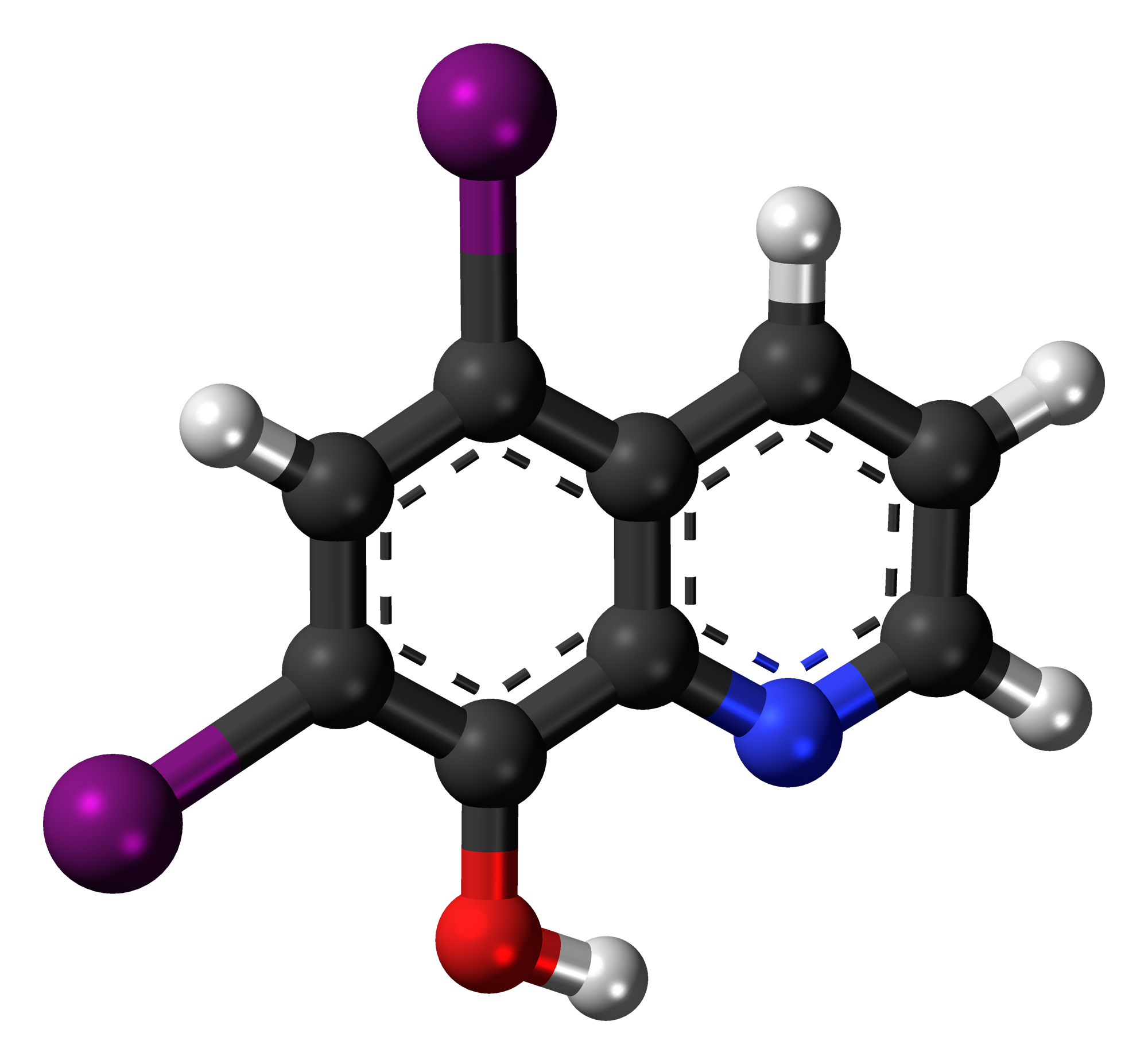

Names
- Preferred IUPAC name 5,7-Diiodoquinolin-8-ol
- Other names Diquinol, iodoxin, diiodoquin, amebaquin

Identifiers
CAS Number	83-73-8
3D model (JSmol)	Interactive image
ChEBI	CHEBI:5950
ChEMBL	ChEMBL86754
ChemSpider	3597
ECHA InfoCard	100.001.362
KEGG	D00581
MeSH	Iodoquinol
PubChem CID	3728
UNII	63W7IE88K8
CompTox Dashboard (EPA)	DTXSID6023155
- InChI: InChI=1S/C9H5I2NO/c10-6-4-7(11)9(13)8-5(6)2-1-3-12-8/h1-4,13H Key: UXZFQZANDVDGMM-UHFFFAOYSA-N; InChI=1/C9H5I2NO/c10-6-4-7(11)9(13)8-5(6)2-1-3-12-8/h1-4,13H Key: UXZFQZANDVDGMM-UHFFFAOYAF
- SMILES: C1=CC2=C(C(=C(C=C2I)I)O)N=C1

Properties
Chemical formula	C_{9}H_{5}I_{2}NO
Molar mass	396.951

Pharmacology
ATC code	G01AC01 (WHO)
- Except where otherwise noted, data are given for materials in their standard state (at 25 °C [77 °F], 100 kPa). verify (what is ?) Infobox references

The quinoline derivative diiodohydroxyquinoline (INN), or iodoquinol (USAN), brand name Diodoquin, can be used in the treatment of amoebiasis.

It is poorly absorbed from the gastrointestinal tract and is used as a luminal amebicide. It acts by chelation of ferrous ions essential for metabolism.

It was discovered by Adco Co. and introduced as diiodohydroxyquinoline.

Susceptibility of Dientamoeba fragilis has been measured.

Iodoquinol is an amebicide used against Entamoeba histolytica, and it is active against both cyst and trophozoites that are localized in the lumen of the intestine. It is considered the drug of choice for treating asymptomatic or moderate forms of amebiasis. The full mechanism of action is unknown. Iodoquinol is used for diseases caused by moderate intestinal amebiasis.

Diiodohydroxyquinoline enhances zinc absorption in the zinc deficiency disorder acrodermatitis enteropathica, probably because it acts as a zinc ionophore.

== See also ==
- Ionophore
