= Metronidazole =

Antibiotic and antiprotozoal medication

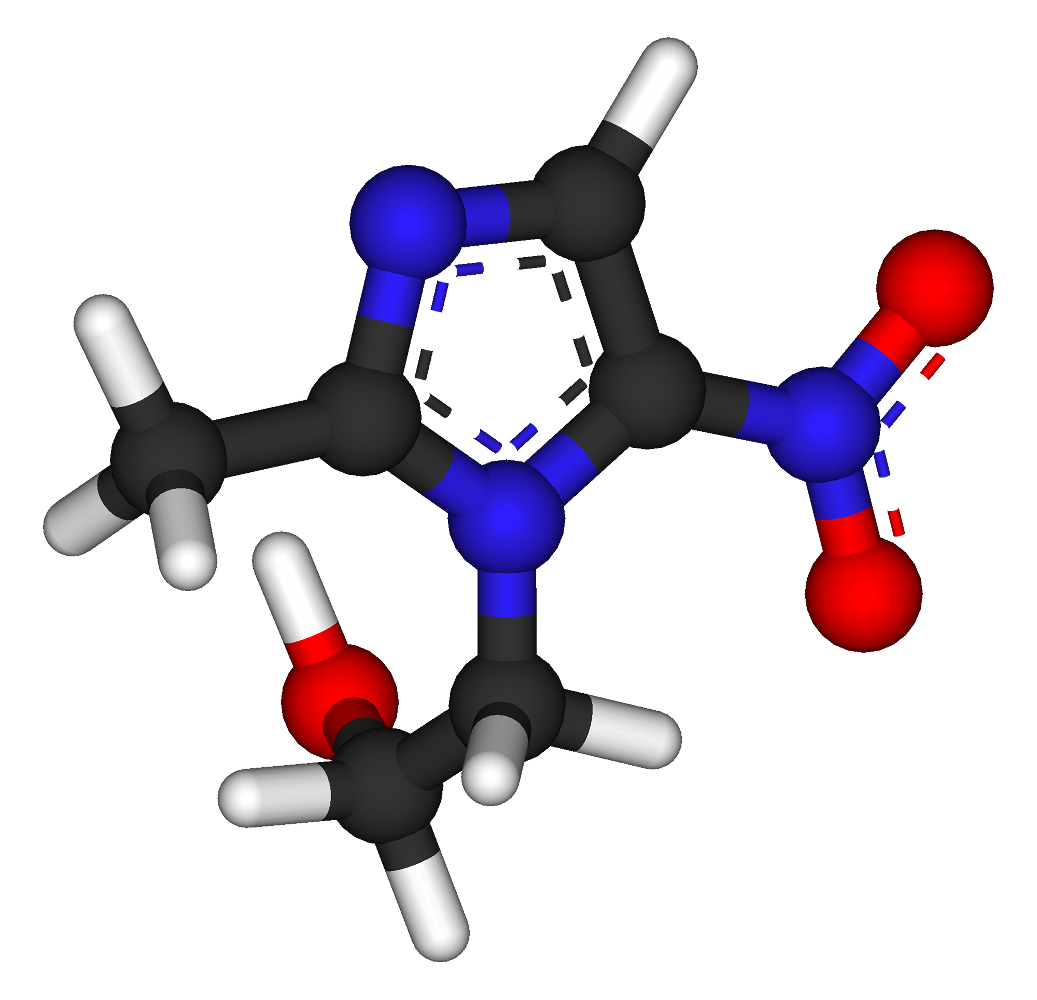

Clinical data
- Trade names: Flagyl, Metrogyl
- AHFS/Drugs.com: Monograph
- MedlinePlus: a689011
- License data: US DailyMed: Metronidazole
- Pregnancy category: AU: B2
- Routes of administration: By mouth, topical, rectal, intravenous, vaginal
- ATC code: A01AB17 (WHO) D06BX01 (WHO), G01AF01 (WHO), J01XD01 (WHO), P01AB01 (WHO), QP51CA01 (WHO)

Legal status
- Legal status: AU: S4 (Prescription only); CA: ℞-only; UK: POM (Prescription only); US: ℞-only

Pharmacokinetic data
- Bioavailability: 80% (by mouth), 60–80% (rectal), 20–25% (vaginal)
- Protein binding: 20%
- Metabolism: Liver
- Metabolites: Hydroxymetronidazole
- Elimination half-life: 8 hours
- Excretion: Urine (77%), faeces (14%)

Identifiers
- IUPAC name: 2-(2-Methyl-5-nitro-1H-imidazol-1-yl)ethanol
- CAS Number: 443-48-1
- PubChem CID: 4173
- DrugBank: DB00916
- ChemSpider: 4029
- UNII: 140QMO216E
- KEGG: D00409
- ChEBI: CHEBI:6909
- ChEMBL: ChEMBL137
- NIAID ChemDB: 007953
- PDB ligand: 2MN (PDBe, RCSB PDB)
- CompTox Dashboard (EPA): DTXSID2020892
- ECHA InfoCard: 100.006.489

Chemical and physical data
- Formula: C_{6}H_{9}N_{3}O_{3}
- Molar mass: 171.156 g·mol^{−1}
- 3D model (JSmol): Interactive image
- Melting point: 159 to 163 °C (318 to 325 °F)
- SMILES: OCCn1c(C)ncc1[N+](=O)[O-]
- InChI: InChI=1S/C6H9N3O3/c1-5-7-4-6(9(11)12)8(5)2-3-10/h4,10H,2-3H2,1H3; Key:VAOCPAMSLUNLGC-UHFFFAOYSA-N

Metronidazole, sold under the brand name Flagyl and Metrogyl among others, is an antibiotic and antiprotozoal medication. It is used either alone or with other antibiotics to treat pelvic inflammatory disease, endocarditis, and bacterial vaginosis. It is effective for dracunculiasis, giardiasis, trichomoniasis, and amebiasis. It is an option for a first episode of mild-to-moderate Clostridioides difficile colitis if vancomycin or fidaxomicin is unavailable. Metronidazole is available orally (by mouth), as a cream or gel, and by slow intravenous infusion (injection into a vein).

Common side effects include nausea, a metallic taste, loss of appetite, and headaches. Occasionally seizures or allergies to the medication may occur.

Metronidazole began to be commercially used in 1960 in France. It is on the World Health Organization's List of Essential Medicines. It is available in most areas of the world. In 2023, it was the 203rd most commonly prescribed medication in the United States, with more than 2 million prescriptions.

== Medical uses ==
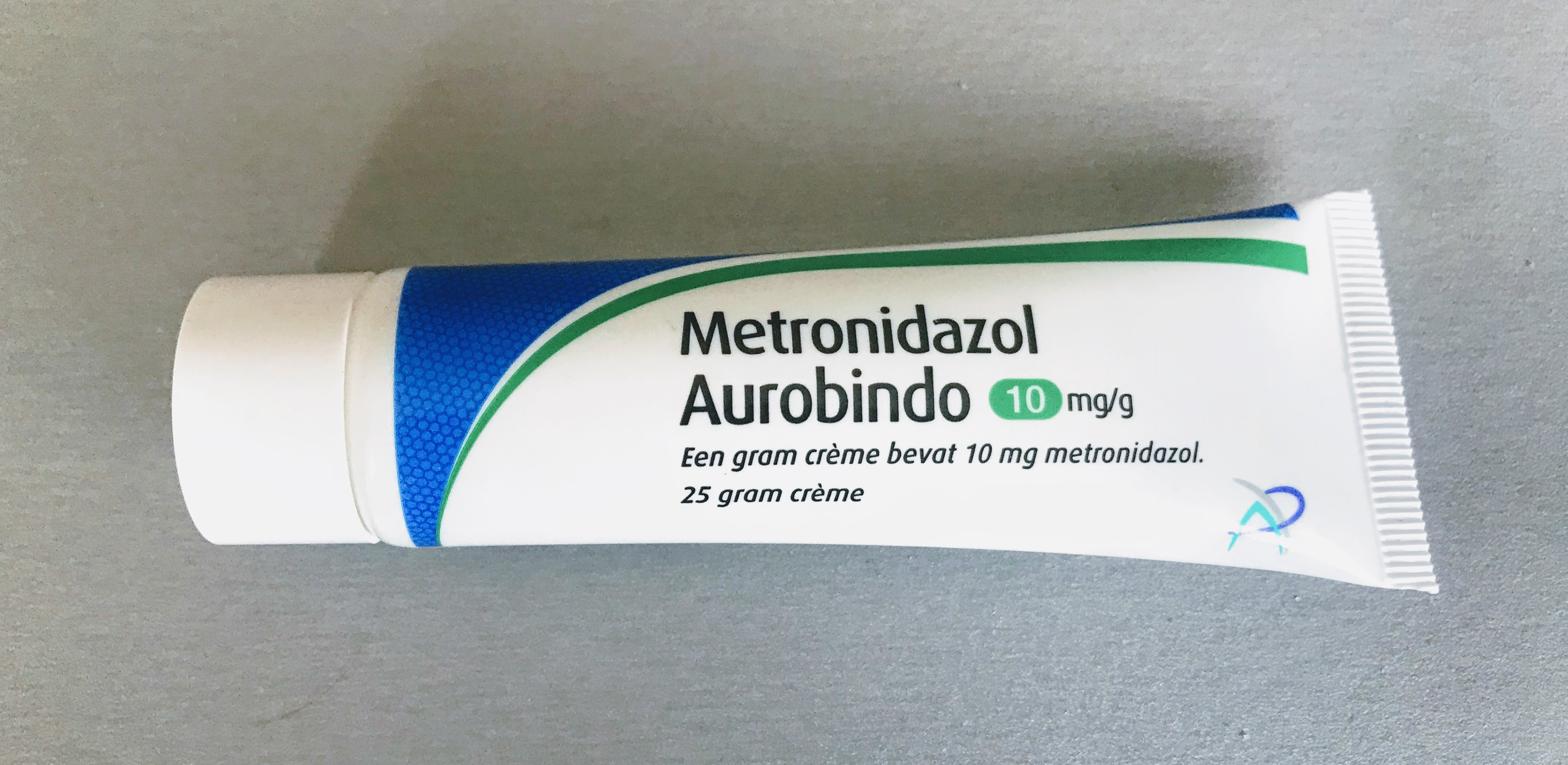
A tube of metronidazole cream

Metronidazole has activity against some protozoans and most anaerobic bacteria (both gram-negative and gram-positive classes) but not the aerobic bacteria.

Metronidazole is primarily used to treat: bacterial vaginosis, pelvic inflammatory disease (along with other antibacterials like ceftriaxone), pseudomembranous colitis, aspiration pneumonia, rosacea (topical), fungating wounds (topical), intra-abdominal infections, lung abscess, periodontal disease, amoebiasis, oral infections, giardiasis, trichomoniasis, and infections caused by susceptible anaerobic organisms such as Bacteroides, Fusobacterium, Clostridium, Peptostreptococcus, and Prevotella species. It is also often used along with other drugs to eradicate Helicobacter pylori and to prevent infection in people recovering from surgery.

Metronidazole is bitter and so the liquid suspension contains metronidazole benzoate. This may require hydrolysis in the gastrointestinal tract and some sources speculate that it may be unsuitable in people with diarrhea or feeding-tubes in the duodenum or jejunum.

=== Bacterial vaginosis ===
Drugs of choice for the treatment of bacterial vaginosis include metronidazole and clindamycin.

An effective treatment option for mixed infectious vaginitis is a combination of clotrimazole and metronidazole.

=== Trichomoniasis ===
The 5-nitroimidazole drugs (metronidazole and tinidazole) are the mainstay of treatment for infection with Trichomonas vaginalis. Treatment for both the infected patient and the patient's sexual partner is recommended, even if asymptomatic. Therapy other than 5-nitroimidazole drugs is also an option, but cure rates are much lower.

=== Giardiasis ===
Oral metronidazole is a treatment option for giardiasis. However, the increasing incidence of nitroimidazole resistance is leading to the increased use of other compound classes.

=== Dracunculus ===
In the case of Dracunculus medinensis (Guinea worm), metronidazole merely facilitates worm extraction rather than killing the worm.

=== c. difficile colitis ===
Initial antibiotic therapy for less-severe Clostridioides difficile infection colitis (pseudomembranous colitis) consists of metronidazole, vancomycin, or fidaxomicin by mouth. In 2017, the IDSA generally recommended vancomycin and fidaxomicin over metronidazole. Vancomycin by mouth has been shown to be more effective in treating people with severe C. difficile colitis.

=== e. histolytica ===
Entamoeba histolytica invasive amebiasis is treated with metronidazole for eradication, in combination with diloxanide to prevent recurrence. Although it is generally a standard treatment it is associated with some side effects.

=== Preterm births ===
Metronidazole has also been used in women to prevent preterm birth associated with bacterial vaginosis, amongst other risk factors including the presence of cervicovaginal fetal fibronectin (fFN). Metronidazole was ineffective in preventing preterm delivery in high-risk pregnant women (selected by history and a positive fFN test) and, conversely, the incidence of preterm delivery was found to be higher in women treated with metronidazole.

=== Hypoxic radiosensitizer ===
In addition to its anti-biotic properties, attempts were also made to use a possible radiation-sensitizing effect of metronidazole in the context of radiation therapy against hypoxic tumors. However, the neurotoxic side effects occurring at the required dosages have prevented the widespread use of metronidazole as an adjuvant agent in radiation therapy. However, other nitroimidazoles derived from metronidazole such as nimorazole with reduced electron affinity showed less serious neuronal side effects and have found their way into radio-onological practice for head and neck tumors in some countries.

=== Perioral dermatitis ===
Metronidazole gel or cream is used as a first line treatment for perioral dermatitis for its anti-inflammatory effects. Canadian Family Physician has recommended topical metronidazole as a third-line treatment for the perioral dermatitis either along with or without oral tetracycline or oral erythromycin as first and second line treatment respectively.

== Adverse effects ==
Common adverse drug reactions (≥1% of those treated with the drug) associated with systemic metronidazole therapy include: nausea, diarrhea, weight loss, abdominal pain, vomiting, headache, dizziness, and metallic taste in the mouth. Intravenous administration is commonly associated with thrombophlebitis. Infrequent adverse effects include: hypersensitivity reactions (rash, itch, flushing, fever), headache, dizziness, vomiting, glossitis, stomatitis, dark urine, and paraesthesia. High doses and long-term systemic treatment with metronidazole are associated with the development of leucopenia, neutropenia, increased risk of peripheral neuropathy, and central nervous system toxicity. Common adverse drug reaction associated with topical metronidazole therapy include local redness, dryness and skin irritation; and eye watering (if applied near eyes). Metronidazole has been associated with carcinogenic activity in animal studies. In rare cases, it can also cause temporary hearing loss that reverses after cessation of the treatment.

Some evidence from studies in rats indicates the possibility it may contribute to serotonin syndrome, although no case reports documenting this have been published to date.

Metronidazole may contribute to functional thiamine (Vitamin B1) deficiency through thiamine antagonism. Rare cases of Metronidazole-Induced Encephalopathy possibly related to thiamine deficiency have been reported.

=== Mutagenesis and carcinogenesis ===
In 2016, metronidazole was listed by the U.S. National Toxicology Program (NTP) as reasonably anticipated to be a human carcinogen. Although some of the testing methods have been questioned, oral exposure has been shown to cause cancer in experimental animals and has also demonstrated some mutagenic effects in bacterial cultures. The relationship between exposure to metronidazole and human cancer is unclear. One study found an excess in lung cancer among women (even after adjusting for smoking), while other studies found either no increased risk, or a statistically insignificant risk. Metronidazole is listed as a possible carcinogen according to the World Health Organization (WHO) International Agency for Research on Cancer (IARC). A study in those with Crohn's disease also found chromosomal abnormalities in circulating lymphocytes in people treated with metronidazole.

=== Stevens–Johnson syndrome ===
Metronidazole alone rarely causes Stevens–Johnson syndrome, but is reported to occur at high rates when combined with mebendazole.

=== Neurotoxicity ===
Several studies in the human and animal models have recorded the neurotoxicity of metronidazole. One possible mechanism underlying this toxicity is that metronidazole may interfere with postsynaptic central monoaminergic neurotransmission and immunomodulation. Additionally other research suggests that the role of nitric oxide isoforms and inflammatory cytokines may also play a role.

== Drug interactions ==
=== Alcohol ===
Consuming alcohol while taking metronidazole has been suspected in case reports to cause a disulfiram-like reaction with effects that can include nausea, vomiting, flushing of the skin, tachycardia, and shortness of breath. People are often advised not to drink alcohol during systemic metronidazole therapy and for at least 48 hours after completion of treatment. However, some studies call into question the mechanism of the interaction of alcohol and metronidazole, and a possible central toxic serotonin reaction for the alcohol intolerance is suggested. Metronidazole is also generally thought to inhibit the liver metabolism of propylene glycol (found in some foods, medicines, and in many electronic cigarette e-liquids), thus propylene glycol may potentially have similar interaction effects with metronidazole.

=== Other drug interactions ===
Metronidazole is a moderate inhibitor of the enzyme CYP2C9 belonging to the cytochrome P450 family. As a result, metronidazole may interact with medications metabolized by this enzyme, such as lomitapide and warfarin.

== Pregnancy and breastfeeding ==
According to online pharmaceutical encyclopaedia drugs.com, no universal evaluation of the safety of metronidazole during pregnancy exists. Some authorities state that metronidazole is contraindicated during the first trimester of pregnancy, whereas use in the second and third trimesters should only occur where local palliative treatment has failed. Some authorities advise against any use during pregnancy except where essential and the benefits outweigh potential risks, in these cases high dosage regimes are not recommended.

Animal studies have not revealed any statistically significant risks of fetal harm associated with medical dosages of metronidazole, with no conclusive evidence of increases in birth defects observed in studies of women who have taken the drug during pregnancy.

Metronidazole is excreted in human milk and is generally considered incompatible with breastfeeding. A decision should be made on whether to discontinue breastfeeding or discontinue the drug based on the needs of the mother.

== Pharmacology ==
Illustration of how metronidazole incorporates itself into anaerobic respiration.

=== Mechanism of action ===
Metronidazole is of the nitroimidazole class. It is a prodrug that functions by forming a toxic radical species, which damages the DNA of microbial cells. Metronidazole enters the bacterial cell by diffusion then is activated by receiving an electron from the reduced ferredoxin produced by pyruvate synthase (PFOR) in anaerobic organisms, equivalent to pyruvate dehydrogenase in aerobic organisms, thus turning into a highly reactive radical anion. This reactive species induces breakage of DNA strands and of the helical structure of the host's DNA. Furthermore, this transformation creates a concentration gradient of the drug that increases its uptake into the cell.

After the radical loses the excited electron to DNA, it recycles back to the unactivated form of metronidazole, ready to be activated again.

This function only occurs when metronidazole is partially reduced, and, because oxygen competes with metronidazole for the electron, this reduction requires a local environment with low oxygen concentration: this usually happens only in anaerobic bacteria and protozoans. Therefore, it has relatively little effect upon human cells or aerobic bacteria. Elevation of oxygen level in the organism will decrease the levels of activated metronidazole, but also increase the rate of recycling.

=== Pharmacokinetics ===
Hydroxymetronidazole, the main metabolite

Oral metronidazole is approximately 80% bioavailable via the gut and peak blood plasma concentrations occur after one to two hours. Food may slow down absorption but does not diminish it. Of the circulating substance, about 20% is bound to plasma proteins. It penetrates well into tissues, the cerebrospinal fluid, the amniotic fluid and breast milk, as well as into abscess cavities.

About 60% of the metronidazole is metabolized by oxidation to the main metabolite hydroxymetronidazole and a carboxylic acid derivative, and by glucuronidation. The metabolites show antibiotic and antiprotozoal activity in vitro. Metronidazole and its metabolites are mainly excreted via the kidneys (77%) and to a lesser extent via the faeces (14%). The biological half-life of metronidazole in healthy adults is eight hours, in infants during the first two months of their lives about 23 hours, and in premature babies up to 100 hours.

The biological activity of hydroxymetronidazole is 30% to 65%, and the elimination half-life is longer than that of the parent compound. The serum half-life of hydroxymetronidazole after suppository was 10 hours, 19 hours after intravenous infusion, and 11 hours after a tablet.

=== Resistance ===
Resistance in parasites is found in T. vaginilis, and G. lamblia, but not E. histolytica, and two major methods are observed. The first method involves an impaired oxygen scavenging capability that increase the local concentration of oxygen, leading to the decreased activation and increased recycling of metronidazole. The second method is associated with lowered levels of pyruvate synthase and ferredoxin, the latter due to the lowered transcription of the ferredoxin gene. Strains employing the second method will still respond to a higher dosage of metronidazole.

Resistance in bacteria is documented in Bacteriodes spp. that are resistant to nitroimidazoles including metronidazole. In the resistant strains, 5-nitroimidazole reductase is identified as the culprit that actively reduces metronidazole to inactive forms. Currently eleven types are identified which are encoded by nimA through nimK respectively. The gene is encoded either in the chromosome or the episome.

Other mechanisms may include reduced drug activation, efflux pumps, altered redox potential and biofilm formation. In the recent years it is observed that the resistance to metronidazole is increasingly common, complicating its clinical effectiveness.

== History ==
The drug was initially developed by Rhône-Poulenc in the 1950s and licensed to G.D. Searle. Searle was acquired by Pfizer in 2003. The original patent expired in 1982, but evergreening reformulation occurred thereafter.

== Brand name ==
In India, it is sold under the brand name Metrogyl, Metrogyl ER, and Flagyl. In Bangladesh, it is available as Amodis, Amotrex, Dirozyl, Filmet, Flagyl, Flamyd, Metco, Metra, Metrodol, Metryl, etc. In Pakistan, it is sold under the brand name of Flagyl and Metrozine. In the United States it is sold under the brand name Noritate. In Nepal, it is sold under the brand name of Amet, Amigyl, Amiz, Dirozyl, Entagyl, Filmet and Flagyl.

== Synthesis ==
2-Methylimidazole (1) may be prepared via the Debus-Radziszewski imidazole synthesis, or from ethylenediamine and acetic acid, followed by treatment with lime, then Raney nickel. 2-Methylimidazole is nitrated to give 2-methyl-4(5)-nitroimidazole (2), which is in turn alkylated with ethylene oxide or 2-chloroethanol to give metronidazole (3):

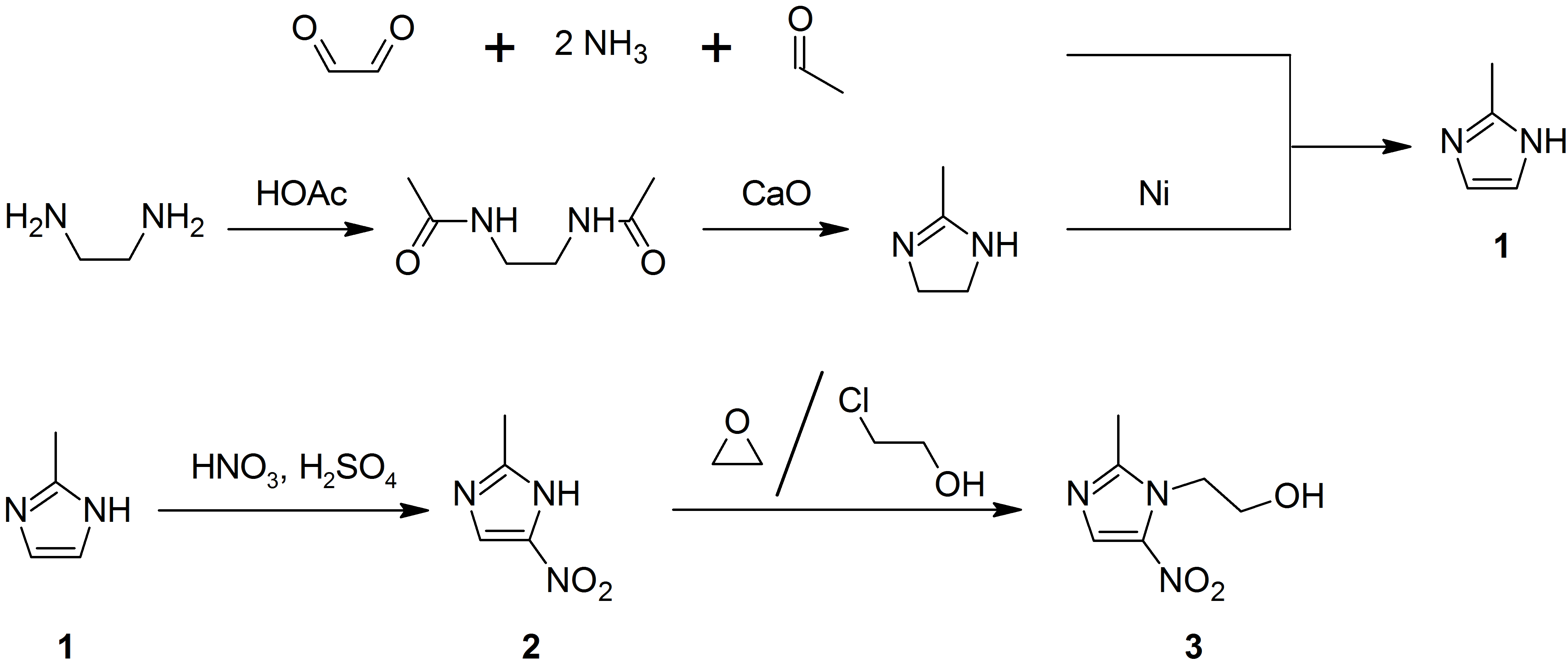

== Research ==
Metronidazole is researched for its anti-inflammatory and immunomodulatory properties. Studies have shown that metronidazole can decrease the production of reactive oxygen species (ROS) and nitric oxide by activated immune cells, such as macrophages and neutrophils. Metronidazole's immunomodulatory properties are thought to be related to its ability to decrease the activation of nuclear factor-kappa B (NF-κB), a transcription factor that regulates the expression of pro-inflammatory cytokines, including chemokines, and adhesion molecules. Cytokines are small proteins that are secreted by immune cells and are central to the immune response. Chemokines are a type of cytokines that act as chemoattractants, meaning they attract and guide immune cells to specific sites in the body where they are needed. Cell adhesion molecules play an important role in the immune response by mediating the interaction between immune cells and other cells in the body, such as endothelial cells, which form the lining of blood vessels. By inhibiting NF-κB activation, metronidazole can reduce the production of pro-inflammatory cytokines, such as TNF-alpha, IL-6, and IL-1β.

Metronidazole has been studied in various immunological disorders, including inflammatory bowel disease, periodontitis, and rosacea. In these conditions, metronidazole has been suspected to have anti-inflammatory and immunomodulatory effects that could be beneficial in the treatment of these conditions. Despite the success in treating rosacea with metronidazole, the exact mechanism of why metronidazole in rosacea is efficient is not precisely known, i.e., which properties of metronidazole help treat rosacea: antibacterial or immunomodulatory or both, or other mechanism is involved. Increased ROS production in rosacea is thought to contribute to the inflammatory process and skin damage, so metronidazole's ability to decrease ROS may explain the mechanism of action in this disease, but this remains speculation.

Metronidazole is also researched as a potential anti-inflammatory agent in periodontitis treatment.

== Veterinary use ==
Metronidazole is used to treat infections of Giardia in dogs, cats, and other companion animals, but it does not reliably clear infection with this organism and is being supplanted by fenbendazole for this purpose in dogs and cats. It is also used for the management of chronic inflammatory bowel disease, gastrointestinal infections, periodontal disease, and systemic infections in cats and dogs. Another common usage is the treatment of systemic and/or gastrointestinal clostridial infections in horses. Metronidazole is used in the aquarium hobby to treat ornamental fish and as a broad-spectrum treatment for bacterial and protozoan infections in reptiles and amphibians. In general, the veterinary community may use metronidazole for any potentially susceptible anaerobic infection. The U.S. Food and Drug Administration (FDA) suggests it only be used when necessary because it has been shown to be carcinogenic in mice and rats, as well as to prevent antimicrobial resistance.

The appropriate dosage of metronidazole varies based on the animal species, the condition being treated and the specific formulation of the product.
