= Tinidazole =

Chemical compound

Clinical data
- Trade names: Tindamax, others
- AHFS/Drugs.com: Monograph
- MedlinePlus: a604036
- License data: US DailyMed: Tinidazole
- Pregnancy category: AU: B3
- Routes of administration: By mouth
- ATC code: J01XD02 (WHO) G01AF21 (WHO), J01RA11 (WHO), J01RA13 (WHO), J01RA18 (WHO), P01AB02 (WHO), P01AB53 (WHO), QP51AA02 (WHO)

Legal status
- Legal status: AU: S4 (Prescription only); UK: POM (Prescription only); US: ℞-only

Pharmacokinetic data
- Protein binding: 12%
- Metabolism: Liver (CYP3A4)
- Elimination half-life: 12–14 hours
- Excretion: Urine (20–25%), feces (12%)

Identifiers
- IUPAC name: 1-(2-ethylsulfonylethyl)-2-methyl-5-nitro-imidazole
- CAS Number: 19387-91-8
- PubChem CID: 5479
- DrugBank: DB00911
- ChemSpider: 5279
- UNII: 033KF7V46H
- KEGG: D01426
- ChEMBL: ChEMBL1220
- NIAID ChemDB: 007940
- CompTox Dashboard (EPA): DTXSID4023676
- ECHA InfoCard: 100.039.089

Chemical and physical data
- Formula: C_{8}H_{13}N_{3}O_{4}S
- Molar mass: 247.27 g·mol^{−1}
- 3D model (JSmol): Interactive image
- SMILES: CCS(=O)(=O)CCN1C(=NC=C1[N+](=O)[O-])C
- InChI: InChI=1S/C8H13N3O4S/c1-3-16(14,15)5-4-10-7(2)9-6-8(10)11(12)13/h6H,3-5H2,1-2H3; Key:HJLSLZFTEKNLFI-UHFFFAOYSA-N

Tinidazole, sold under the brand name Tindamax among others, is a medication used against infections caused by certain anaerobic bacteria and protozoa. It was developed in 1972 and is a prominent member of the nitroimidazole antibiotic class.

Tinidazole is a therapeutic alternative on the World Health Organization's List of Essential Medicines.

== Medical uses ==
Tinidazole is a narrow spectrum antimicrobial drug used to treat infections caused by Helicobacter pylori, Entamoeba histolytica, Giardia spp. and Trichomonas vaginalis.

== Side effects ==
Drinking alcohol while taking tinidazole causes an unpleasant disulfiram-like reaction, which includes nausea, vomiting, headache, increased blood pressure, flushing, and shortness of breath.

== Pharmacology ==
=== Pharmacokinetics ===
Elimination half-life is 13.2 ± 1.4 hours. Plasma half-life is 12 to 14 hours.

== History ==
Tinidazole was approved for medical treatment in the United States in 2004.

== See also ==
- Fenticonazole nitrate/lidocaine/tinidazole
