= Paromomycin =

Chemical compound

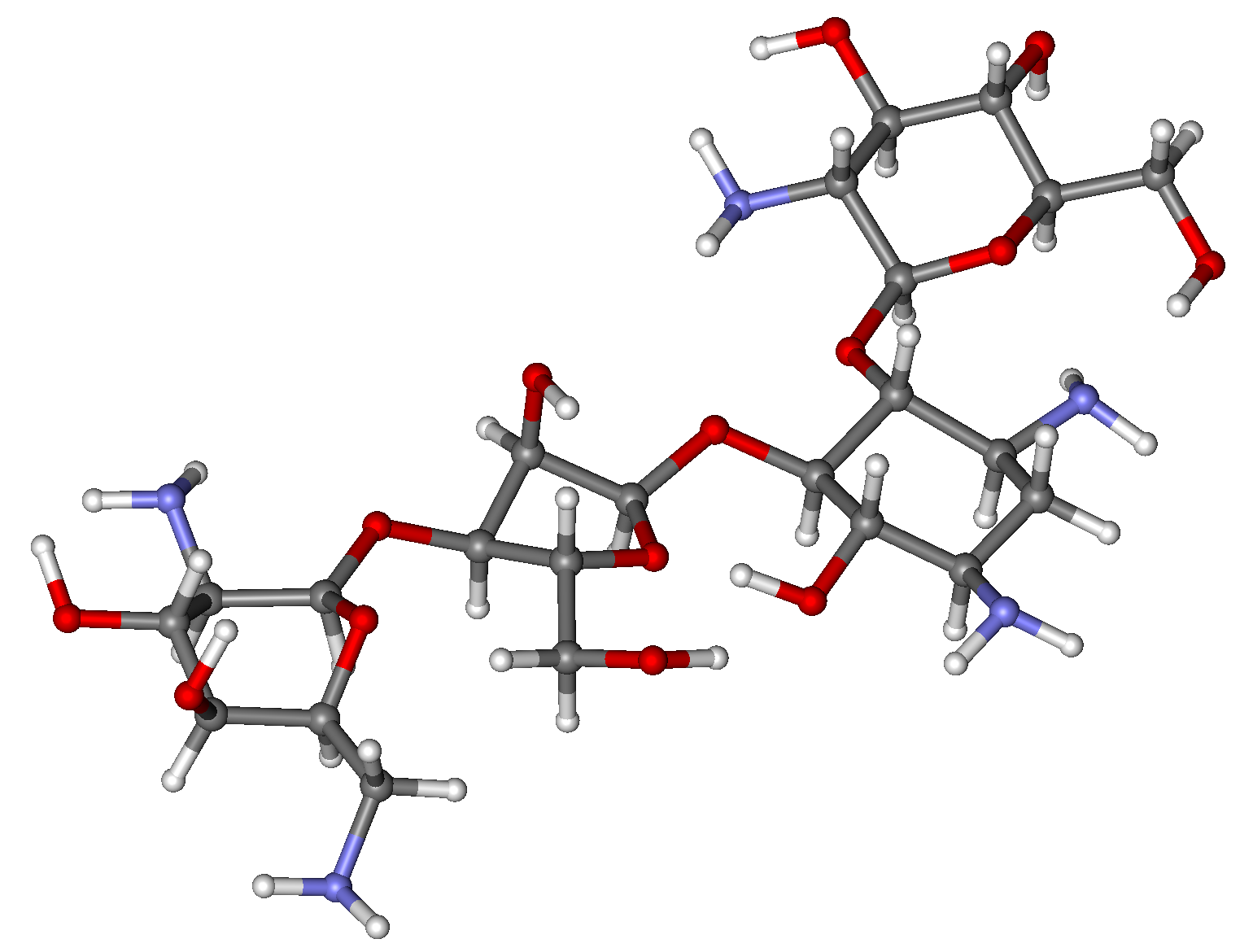

Clinical data
- Trade names: Catenulin, Aminosidine, Humatin, others
- Other names: monomycin, aminosidine
- AHFS/Drugs.com: Monograph
- MedlinePlus: a601098
- License data: US DailyMed: Paromomycin
- Pregnancy category: C
- Routes of administration: By mouth, intramuscular, topical
- ATC code: A07AA06 (WHO) QJ01GB92 (WHO)

Legal status
- Legal status: US: ℞-only

Pharmacokinetic data
- Bioavailability: Poorly absorbed in the GI tract
- Metabolism: Not available
- Excretion: Fecal

Identifiers
- IUPAC name: (2R,3S,4R,5R,6S)-5-amino-6-[(1R,2S,3S,4R,6S)- 4,6-diamino-2-[(2S,3R,4R,5R)-4-[(2R,3R,4R,5R,6S)- 3-amino-6-(aminomethyl)-4,5-dihydroxy-oxan-2-yl] oxy-3-hydroxy-5-(hydroxymethyl)oxolan-2-yl]oxy- 3-hydroxy-cyclohexyl]oxy-2-(hydroxymethyl)oxane-3,4-diol
- CAS Number: 7542-37-2; Sulfate: 1263-89-4
- PubChem CID: 441375; Sulfate: 165580
- DrugBank: DB01421
- ChemSpider: 145115; Sulfate: 390117
- UNII: 61JJC8N5ZK; Sulfate: 845NU6GJPS
- ChEBI: CHEBI:7934
- ChEMBL: ChEMBL370143
- CompTox Dashboard (EPA): DTXSID8023424
- ECHA InfoCard: 100.028.567

Chemical and physical data
- Formula: C_{23}H_{45}N_{5}O_{14}
- Molar mass: 615.634 g·mol^{−1}
- 3D model (JSmol): Interactive image; Sulfate: Interactive image
- SMILES: O([C@H]1[C@H](O[C@H]2[C@H](O)[C@H](O[C@H]3O[C@@H](CN)[C@@H](O)[C@H](O)[C@H]3N)[C@@H](CO)O2)[C@@H](O)[C@H](N)C[C@@H]1N)[C@H]4O[C@H](CO)[C@@H](O)[C@H](O)[C@H]4N; Sulfate: O=S(=O)(O)O.O([C@H]3[C@H](O[C@@H]2O[C@H](CO)[C@@H](O[C@H]1O[C@@H](CN)[C@@H](O)[C@H](O)[C@H]1N)[C@H]2O)[C@@H](O)[C@H](N)C[C@@H]3N)[C@H]4O[C@@H]([C@@H](O)[C@H](O)[C@H]4N)CO
- InChI: InChI=1S/C23H45N5O14/c24-2-7-13(32)15(34)10(27)21(37-7)41-19-9(4-30)39-23(17(19)36)42-20-12(31)5(25)1-6(26)18(20)40-22-11(28)16(35)14(33)8(3-29)38-22/h5-23,29-36H,1-4,24-28H2/t5-,6+,7+,8-,9-,10-,11-,12+,13-,14-,15-,16-,17-,18-,19-,20-,21-,22-,23+/m1/s1; Key:UOZODPSAJZTQNH-LSWIJEOBSA-N; Sulfate: InChI=1S/C23H45N5O14.H2O4S/c24-2-7-13(32)15(34)10(27)21(37-7)41-19-9(4-30)39-23(17(19)36)42-20-12(31)5(25)1-6(26)18(20)40-22-11(28)16(35)14(33)8(3-29)38-22;1-5(2,3)4/h5-23,29-36H,1-4,24-28H2;(H2,1,2,3,4)/t5-,6+,7+,8-,9-,10-,11-,12+,13-,14-,15-,16-,17-,18-,19-,20-,21-,22-,23+;/m1./s1; Key:LJRDOKAZOAKLDU-UDXJMMFXSA-N

Paromomycin is an antimicrobial used to treat a number of parasitic infections including amebiasis, giardiasis, leishmaniasis, and tapeworm infection. It is a first-line treatment for amebiasis or giardiasis during pregnancy. Otherwise, it is generally a second line treatment option. It is taken by mouth, applied to the skin, or by injection into a muscle.

Common side effects when taken by mouth include loss of appetite, vomiting, abdominal pain, and diarrhea. When applied to the skin side effects include itchiness, redness, and blisters. When given by injection there may be fever, liver problems, or hearing loss. Use during breastfeeding appears to be safe. Paromomycin is in the aminoglycoside family of medications and causes microbe death by stopping the creation of bacterial proteins.

Paromomycin was discovered in the 1950s from a type of streptomyces and came into medical use in 1960. It is on the World Health Organization's List of Essential Medicines. Paromomycin is available as a generic medication.

== Medical uses ==
It is an antimicrobial used to treat intestinal parasitic infections such as cryptosporidiosis and amoebiasis, and other diseases such as leishmaniasis. Paromomycin was demonstrated to be effective against cutaneous leishmaniasis in clinical studies in the USSR in the 1960s, and in trials with visceral leishmaniasis in the early 1990s.

The route of administration is intramuscular injection and capsule. Paromomycin topical cream with or without gentamicin is an effective treatment for ulcerative cutaneous leishmaniasis, according to the results of a phase-3, randomized, double-blind, parallel group–controlled trial.

=== Pregnancy and breastfeeding ===
The medication is poorly absorbed. The effect it may have on the baby is still unknown.

There is limited data regarding the safety of taking paromomycin while breastfeeding but because the drug is poorly absorbed minimal amounts of drug will be secreted in breastmilk.

=== HIV/AIDS ===
There is limited evidence that paromomycin can be used in persons coinfected with HIV and Cryptosporidium. A few small trials have shown a reduction in oocyst shedding after treatment with paromomycin.

== Adverse effects ==
The most common adverse effects associated with paromomycin sulfate are abdominal cramps, diarrhea, heartburn, nausea, and vomiting. Long-term use of paromomycin increases the risk for bacterial or fungal infection. Signs of overgrowth include white patches in the oral cavities. Other less common adverse events include myasthenia gravis, kidney damage, enterocolitis, malabsorption syndrome, eosinophilia, headache, hearing loss, ringing in the ear, itching, severe dizziness, and pancreatitis.

== Interactions ==
Paromomycin belongs to the aminoglycoside drug class and therefore are toxic to the kidneys and to ears. These toxicities are additive and are more likely to occur when used with other drugs that cause ear and kidney toxicity. Concurrent use of foscarnet increases the risk of kidney toxicity. Concurrent use of colistimethate and paromomycin can cause a dangerous slowing of breathing known as respiratory depression, and should be done with extreme caution if necessary. When used with systemic antibiotics such as paromomycin, the cholera vaccine can cause an immune response. Use with strong diuretics, which can also harm hearing, should be avoided. Paromomycin may have dangerous reactions when used with the paralytic succinylcholine by increasing its neuromuscular effects.

There are no known food or drink interactions with paromomycin.

== Mechanism ==
Paromomycin is a protein synthesis inhibitor in nonresistant cells by binding to 16S ribosomal RNA. This broad-spectrum antibiotic soluble in water, is very similar in action to neomycin. Antimicrobial activity of paromomycin against Escherichia coli and Staphylococcus aureus has been shown. Paromomycin works as an antibiotic by increasing the error rate in ribosomal translation. Paromomycin binds to an RNA loop, where residues A1492 and A1493 are usually stacked, and expels these two residues. These two residues are involved in detection of correct Watson-Crick pairing between the codon and anti codon. When correct interactions are achieved, the binding provides energy to expel the two residues. Paromomycin binding provides enough energy for residue expulsion and thus results in the ribosome incorporating the incorrect amino acid into the nascent peptide chain. Recent real-time measurements of aminoglycoside effects on protein synthesis in live E. coli cells found that paromomycin's interference with protein synthesis is not only due to the misreading of mRNA but also due to a significant reduction in the overall protein elongation rate, suggesting a more comprehensive inhibition of protein synthesis.

== Pharmacokinetics ==
=== Absorption ===
GI absorption is poor. Any obstructions or factors which impair GI motility may increase the absorption of the drug from the digestive tract. In addition, any structural damage, such as lesions or ulcerations, will tend to increase drug absorption.

For intramuscular (IM) injection, the absorption is rapid. Paromomycin will reach peak plasma concentration within one hour following IM injection. The in-vitro and in-vivo activities parallel those of neomycin.

=== Elimination ===
Almost 100% of the oral dose is eliminated unchanged via feces. Any absorbed drug will be excreted in urine.

== History ==
Paromomycin was discovered in the 1950s amongst the secondary metabolites of a variety of Streptomyces then known as Streptomyces krestomuceticus, now known as Streptomyces rimosus. It came into medical use in 1960.
