= Coccidiostat =

Antiprotozoal agent

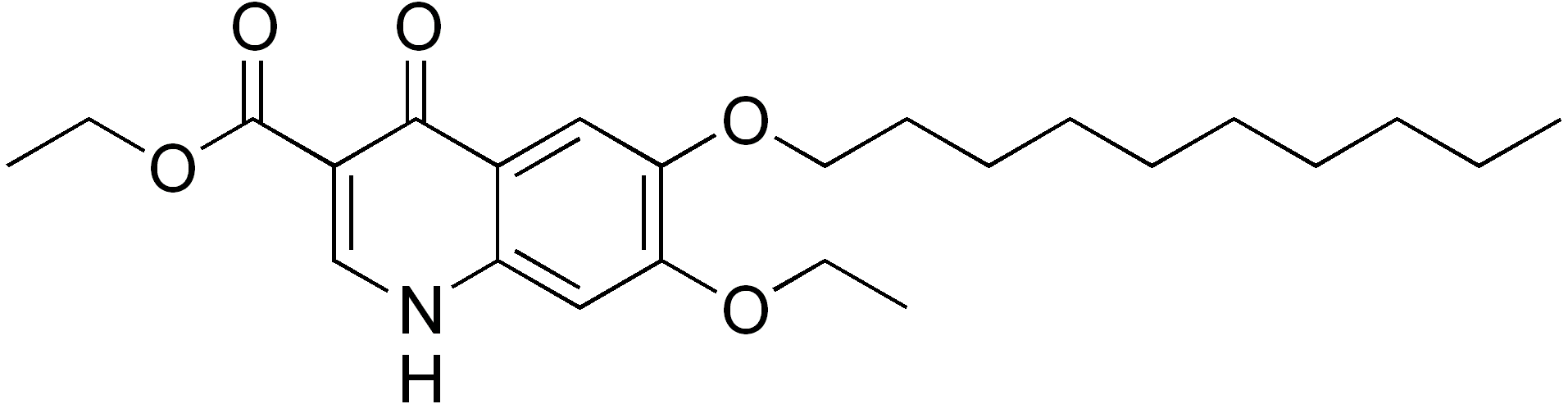
Chemical structure of decoquinate, a coccidiostat used in veterinary medicine

A coccidiostat is an antiprotozoal agent that acts upon Coccidia parasites.

Examples include:

- Amprolium
- Arprinocid
- Artemether
- Clazuril
- Clopidol
- Decoquinate
- Diclazuril
- Dinitolmide
- Ethopabate
- Halofuginone
- Lasalocid
- Maduramicin
- Monensin
- Narasin
- Nicarbazin
- Oryzalin
- Ponazuril
- Robenidine
- Roxarsone
- Salinomycin
- Spiramycin
- Sulfadiazine
- Sulfadimethoxine
- Sulfaquinoxaline
- Toltrazuril
