= C8H7N3O5 =

The molecular formula C_{8}H_{7}N_{3}O_{5} (molar mass: 225.16 g/mol, exact mass: 225.0386 u) may refer to:

- Dinitolmide, also known as zoalene
- Furazolidone
