= Max Tishler =

American chemist (1906–1989)

- Born: October 30, 1906; Boston, Massachusetts
- Died: March 18, 1989 (aged 82); Middletown, Connecticut
- Education: Tufts College
- Known for: riboflavin industrial synthesis, cortisone industrial synthesis, sulfaquinoxaline, penicillin
- Children: 2, including Peter Verveer Tishler
- Awards: IRI Medal (1961); National Medal of Science (1987); Priestley Medal

Max Tishler (October 30, 1906 – March 18, 1989) was president of Merck Sharp and Dohme Research Laboratories where he led the research teams that synthesized ascorbic acid, riboflavin, cortisone, pyridoxine, pantothenic acid, nicotinamide, methionine, threonine, and tryptophan. He also developed the fermentation processes for actinomycin, vitamin B_{12}, streptomycin, and penicillin. Tishler invented sulfaquinoxaline for the treatment for coccidiosis.

== Biography ==
He was born in Boston, Massachusetts on October 30, 1906. His father repaired shoes and he abandoned the family in 1911. Max worked in a pharmacy during the flu pandemic of 1918. He studied chemistry as an undergraduate at Tufts College, where he was a member of the Pi Lambda Phi fraternity.

In 1934 he earned his Ph.D. in organic chemistry from Harvard University. He married Elizabeth M. Verveer in 1934. He taught at Harvard from 1934 to 1937. His son, Peter Verveer Tishler, was born on July 18, 1937. In 1937, he took a position at Merck. His first project at Merck was to produce riboflavin. In the 1940s he developed a process for the synthesis of cortisone.

In 1970 he retired from Merck, and taught chemistry at Wesleyan University.

He died of emphysema at Middlesex Memorial Hospital in Middletown, Connecticut on March 18, 1989.

== Education ==
- B.S. Chemistry, Tufts College, 1928, magna cum laude
- M.A. Chemistry, Harvard University, 1933
- Ph.D. Organic Chemistry, Harvard University, 1934

Research Advisor: Elmer P. Kohler, Dissertation title: "I. The reduction of alpha halo-ketones. II. The action of organic magnesium halides on alpha halo-ketones and on alpha halo-sulfones."

== Honors ==
- Chemical Pioneer Award (1968)
- Priestley Medal (1970)
- American Institute of Chemists Gold Medal (1977)
- National Medal of Science
- National Inventors Hall of Fame
- IRI Medal
