= C14H14N4O =

The molecular formula C_{14}H_{14}N_{4}O (molar mass: 254.293 g/mol) may refer to:

- Phenamidine (4,4'-Diamidinodiphenyl ether)
- AH-494
