= Hydrology of Fishing Creek (North Branch Susquehanna River tributary) =

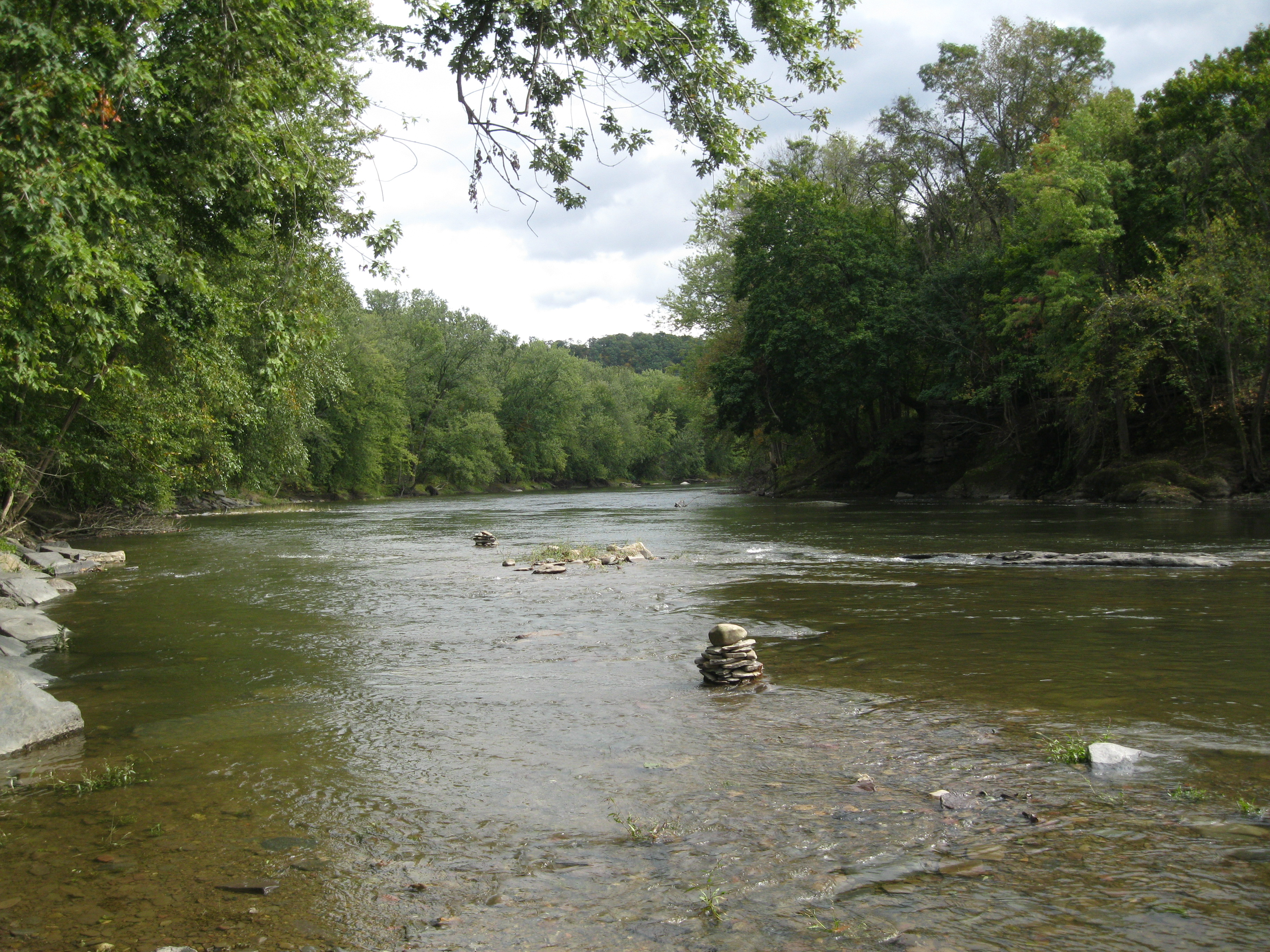
Fishing Creek not far from its mouth

Fishing Creek is a tributary of the Susquehanna River, in Columbia County, Pennsylvania, in the United States. Hydrology involves the discharge, the pH, the chemical hydrology, the dams, and the water temperature. Data has been gathered from a United States Geological Survey gauging station near Bloomsburg, Pennsylvania. The pH of the waters in the Fishing Creek watershed ranges from 4.9 to 8.5 in various places.

== Discharge ==
Approximately 1 mile (2 km) downstream of Orangeville, Fishing Creek's discharge averages 615 cubic feet per second (17.4 m^{3}/s) per second and its median discharge is 361 cubic feet per second (10.2 m^{3}/s) second. The creek's lowest recorded discharge rate in that location is 90 cubic feet per second (2.5 m^{3}/s) in 1962 and its highest was 2,580 cubic feet per second (73 m^{3}/s) in 1981. Further upstream, in Benton, Fishing Creek's discharge is almost always less than 720 cubic feet per second (20 m^{3}/s), and is far lower during the summer, usually approaching 0. The typical discharge of Fishing Creek at this location is around 540 cubic feet per second (15 m^{3}/s). The streambeds of West Branch and East Branch Fishing Creeks commonly run dry in the summer. In dry years, they are dry for 105 days on average, while in wet years they are on average dry for 5 days.

At a stream gauging station near Bloomsburg, Fishing Creek's discharge ranged between 10 cubic feet per second (0.28 m^{3}/s) and 5,350 cubic feet per second (151 m^{3}/s) between 2002 and 2012. The lowest discharge recorded during this time occurred on November 9, 2004. The highest discharge recorded during this time occurred on September 23, 2003.

== pH ==
Near Benton, Fishing Creek's pH ranges from around 5.6 to around 7.25. Near Camp Lavigne, it ranges from 5.5 to 7.1. East Branch Fishing Creek is the only stream in the watershed whose pH drops below 5.5. Its pH can be as low as 4.9. West Creek and Coles Creek are the least acidic streams in the Fishing Creek watershed. Their pH is usually above 6.3 and often above 7. Typically, Fishing Creek and its tributaries are not at risk for being too acidic for the optimal health of fish, but in early spring during snowmelts, the pH levels near the limit that brook trout can tolerate. Fishing Creek's waters are acidic due to acid rain.

The waters of Fishing Creek at a gauging station near Bloomsburg had pH levels ranging from 5.8 to 8.5 between 2002 and 2012. The lowest pH during that time (5.8) occurred on December 17, 2003. The highest pH during that time (8.5) occurred on February 14, 2012. The average pH during that time and at that location was 7.242.

== Dissolved nonmetals ==
The concentration of dissolved oxygen in Fishing Creek has been measured to range from approximately 5 to 17.5 milligrams per liter at Benton. In a 14-month period from May 2010 to July 2011, the dissolved oxygen level for the streams in the Fishing Creek watershed was highest in February 2011 and lowest in June, July, or August 2010, depending on the stream. A site on Fishing Creek, near Camp Lavigne, had slightly less fluctuation; there it ranged from 8 to 17 milligrams per liter of dissolved oxygen.

The concentration of hydrogen ions in the waters of Fishing Creek near Bloomsburg between 2002 and 2012 ranged from 0.00001 to 0.00153 milligrams per liter. The date of the lowest concentration of hydrogen ions at that location was on March 1 and July 16, 2003. The date of the highest concentration of hydrogen ions at the location on the creek was December 17, 2003. The average concentration of hydrogen ions was 0.0001 milligrams per liter.

The total concentration of nitrogen in the waters of Fishing Creek at the gauging station near Bloomsburg between 2002 and 2012 ranged from 0.52 to 2.8 milligrams per liter. The date during which the lowest concentration of nitrogen occurred was October 14, 2009. The date of the highest concentration was on January 13, 2003. The average concentration of nitrogen between 2002 and 2012 was 1.212 milligrams per liter.

== Dissolved metals ==
The concentration of dissolved oxygen in Fishing Creek near Bloomsburg between 2002 and 2012 ranged between 4.1 and 17.1 milligrams per liter. The lowest concentration of dissolved oxygen in the creek during that period and at that location occurred on July 25, 2005. The highest concentration of dissolved oxygen occurred on January 6, 2009. The average concentration of dissolved oxygen was 10.942 milligrams per liter.

Fishing Creek contains dissolved aluminum but in most places not enough to be toxic, although some of its tributaries have aluminum concentrations approaching lethal levels for fish. The only tributary of Fishing Creek which contains dissolved aluminum in concentrations of over 100 micrograms per liter is East Branch Fishing Creek. Fishing Creek itself and all of its other tributaries had dissolved aluminum concentrations of less than 70 micrograms per liter. This concentration is linked to the thawing of soils, as demonstrated by the fact that aluminum levels in Fishing Creek peak in March and April and drop to almost zero in the summer.

The total concentration of calcium in the waters of Fishing Creek at the gauging station near Bloomsburg between 2002 and 2012 ranged from 5.5 milligrams per liter to 26 milligrams per liter. The lowest concentration of calcium occurred on February 6, 2008. The highest concentration of calcium occurred on June 18, 2012. The average concentration of calcium was 7.532 milligrams per liter.

The total concentration of magnesium in the waters of Fishing Creek at the gauging station near Bloomsburg between 2002 and 2012 ranged from 1.5 milligrams per liter to 6.7 milligrams per liter. The lowest concentration of magnesium occurred on November 1, 2006. The highest concentration of magnesium occurred on June 18, 2012. The average concentration of calcium is 1.748 milligrams per liter.

The total concentration of iron in the waters of Fishing Creek at the gauging station near Bloomsburg between 2002 and 2012 ranged from 40 micrograms per liter to 5730 micrograms per liter. The lowest concentration of iron occurred on April 6, 2006, November 12, 2008, and June 18, 2012. The highest concentration of iron occurred on July 5, 2011. The average concentration of iron was 397.37 micrograms per liter.

The total concentration of manganese in the waters of Fishing Creek at the gauging station near Bloomsburg between 2002 and 2012 ranged from less than 10 to 240 micrograms per liter, not counting the times that its presence was "verified but not quantified". The lowest concentration of manganese occurred on November 20, 2002. The highest concentration of manganese occurred on September 23, 2003. The average concentration was approximately 42 micrograms per liter.

In all times between 2002 and 2012 that the concentration of copper in the waters of Fishing Creek at the gauging station near Bloomsburg was measured, it was under 10 milligrams per liter. The concentration was under 4 micrograms per liter all but one of the times that it was measured. The concentration of lead in the waters of Fishing Creek was always under 1 microgram per liter, as measured between 2002 and 2012 at the gauging station near Bloomsburg. The concentration of nickel was always under 4 micrograms per liter all the times it was measured and its presence quantified between 2002 and 2012. The concentration of strontium was only measured once, on February 14, 2012. The concentration was 90 micrograms per liter.

The concentration of zinc in the waters of Fishing Creek has been under 5 micrograms per liter all the times that it was detected and measured. The other time, on April 11, 2012, it was 10 micrograms per liter. The concentration of selenium has only been measured once, on February 14, 2012. It was under 7 micrograms per liter.

== Simple compounds ==
The concentration of carbon dioxide in the waters of Fishing Creek near Bloomsburg between 2002 and 2012 ranged from 0.3 to 34 milligrams per liter. The date during which there was the lowest concentration of carbon dioxide was April 6, 2006 and February 14, 2012. The date during which there was the highest concentration of carbon dioxide at the location on the creek was December 17, 2003. The average concentration of carbon dioxide was 2.04 milligrams per liter.

The total concentration of ammonia in the waters of Fishing Creek at the gauging station near Bloomsburg between 2002 and 2012 ranged from less than 0.02 milligrams per liter to 0.06 milligrams per liter. The highest concentration of ammonia occurred on May 19, 2009. The total concentration of nitrates in the waters of Fishing Creek at the gauging station near Bloomsburg between 2002 and 2012 was always less than 0.04 milligrams per liter.

The total concentration of phosphates in the waters of Fishing Creek at the gauging station near Bloomsburg between 2002 and 2012 ranged from less than 0.031 milligrams per liter to 0.11 milligrams per liter. The highest concentration of phosphates occurred on May 19, 2009. The total concentration of phosphorus itself in the waters of Fishing Creek at the gauging station near Bloomsburg between 2002 and 2012 ranged from less than 0.01 milligrams per liter to 0.575 milligrams per liter. The highest phosphorus concentration occurred on July 5, 2011.

The total concentration of sulfates in the waters of Fishing Creek at the gauging station near Bloomsburg between 2002 and 2012 ranged from 6.8 to 34.5 milligrams per liter. However, the second highest concentration was only 15.2 milligrams per liter. The highest concentration of sulfates occurred on February 14, 2012. The lowest concentration occurred on September 23, 2003. The average concentration was 10.57 milligrams per liter.

== Complex compounds ==
The total concentration of caffeine in the waters of Fishing Creek near Bloomsburg between 2002 and 2012 ranged from an estimated 0.012 micrograms per liter to less than 0.2 micrograms per liter. The highest concentration occurred on November 12, 2008 and May 19, 2009. The lowest concentration occurred on February 6, 2008. The average concentration was approximately 0.099 micrograms per liter.

The total concentration of acetaminophen in the waters of Fishing Creek near Bloomsburg between 2002 and 2012 ranged from an estimated 7 nanograms per liter to 88 nanograms per liter. The lowest concentration occurred on August 25, 2008 and the highest concentration occurred on March 17, 2009. The average concentration was approximately 63 nanograms per liter.

The total concentration of codeine in the waters of Fishing Creek near Bloomsburg has been measured several times. It was under 0.04 micrograms per liter all the times that it was measured.

The total concentration of phenols in the waters of Fishing Creek near Bloomsburg has been measured once, on November 9, 2004. The concentration was less than five micrograms per liter. The total concentration of chlortetracycline and oxytetracycline in the waters of Fishing Creek near Bloomsburg between 2002 and 2012 have also both been measured several times. The concentrations of both compounds was always less than 0.01 micrograms per liter. Sulfamethazine is another chemical whose concentration has been measured in the waters of Fishing Creek. Its concentration is always less than 5 nanograms per liter.

The concentration of dehydronifedipine in the waters of Fishing Creek has also been measured a number of times. On February 6, 2008, April 3, 2008, June 10, 2008, and August 25, 2008, the concentration was the lowest, at less than 0.06 micrograms per liter. On November 12, 2008, March 17, 2009, May 19, 2009, and July 8, 2009, the concentration was at its highest, at less than 0.08 micrograms per liter. The average concentration is 0.07 micrograms per liter.

The concentration of cotinine in the waters of Fishing Creek was measured eight times in 2008 and 2009. All of these times, the concentration was less than 26 nanograms per liter. The concentration of diltiazem was also measured eight times in 2008 and 2009.

The total concentration of dissolved solids at Fishing Creek near Bloomsburg between 2002 and 2012 ranged from less than 2 to 166 milligrams per liter. The lowest concentration during that time occurred on January 13, 2003; May 19, 2003; October 21, 2003; December 17, 2003; March 14, 2005; May 5, 2005; February 8, 2006; April 6, 2006; August 3, 2006; January 4, 2007; May 24, 2007; July 11, 2007; December 4, 2007; and April 3, 2008. The highest concentration during that time occurred on September 23, 2003.

The total concentration of azithromycin in Fishing Creek near Bloomsburg between 2002 and 2012 was less than 5 nanograms per liter every time it was measured. The total concentration of carbamazepine in Fishing Creek in the same place and time ranged from approximately 1 nanogram per liter to less than 40 nanograms per liter. The lowest concentration occurred on February 6, 2008. The highest concentration occurred several times in 2008 and 2009.

The total concentration of diphenhydramine in Fishing Creek ranged from approximately 2 to less than 40 nanograms per liter. The lowest concentration occurred on June 10, 2008. The highest concentration occurred once in 2008 and three times in 2009. The average concentration was 22.125 nanograms per liter.

== Biological contaminants ==
The concentration of fecal coliform has been measured once, on November 9, 2004. Its concentration was under 20 M-FC 0.45uMF col per 100 milliliters.

The concentration of E coli in the waters of Fishing Creek at the gauging station near Bloomsburg between 2002 and 2012 ranged from less than 3 to 150 m-TEC MF water col per 100 milliliters. The lowest concentration occurred on April 3, 2008. The highest concentration occurred on February 6, 2008. The average concentration was 58.14 m-TEC MF water col per 100 milliliters.

The concentration of enterococcus in the waters of Fishing Creek at the gauging station near Bloomsburg has ranged from under 3 to 680 m-E MF water col per 100 milliliters. The lowest concentration occurred on November 12, 2008 and the highest concentration occurred on February 6, 2008. The average concentration was 120.71 m-E MF water col per 100 milliliters.

== Dams ==
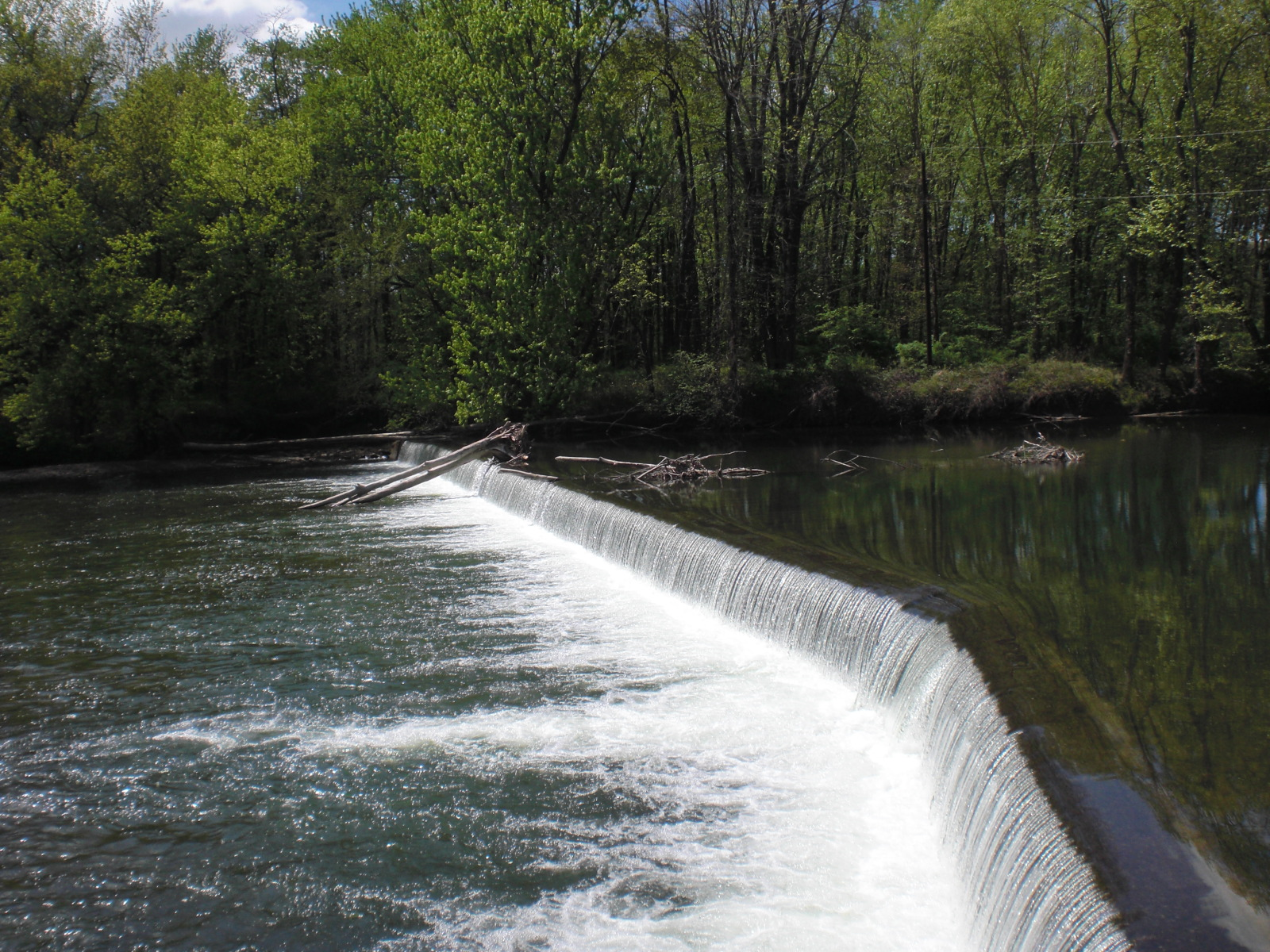
Boone's Dam near Bloomsburg, Pennsylvania

There is a lowhead dam referred to by locals as Boone's Dam on Fishing Creek near where the creek flows past Bloomsburg. A dam was built on Fishing Creek in the northern reaches of Bloomsburg with the purpose of powering nearby Irondale furnaces. Additionally, a dam was built on Fishing Creek about 2 miles (3 km) north of Bloomsburg in 1818 by John Barton. In the 1800s and early 1900s there were two other dams on Fishing Creek. One was in Orange Township, and the other, a 212-foot (65 m) concrete dam, was in Orangeville. A dam known as the Benton Dam was built on upper Fishing Creek, directly upstream of Benton.

== Water temperature ==
The highest water temperature of a stream in the Fishing Creek watershed is that of West Creek, which can reach 77 °F (25 °C) in the summer. The water temperature of Fishing Creek in Benton can reach 75 °F (24 °C) in the summer. The water temperature of Coles Creek, a tributary of Fishing Creek, only reaches 66 to 68 °F (19 to 20 °C) in the summer. In the winter, the water temperature of the main stem of Fishing Creek is around 32 °F (0 °C), and West Branch Fishing Creek's temperature can reach as low as 28 °F (−2 °C) in the winter, making it the coldest stream in the watershed during winter.

At a gauging station near Bloomsburg, the water temperature ranged from 32°F (0.1°C) to 78°F (25.7°C) between November 2002 and November 2012. The lowest water temperature of the creek occurred on January 10, 2011. The highest water temperature of the creek in this location occurred on August 3, 2006. The average water temperature in August on Fishing Creek near Bloomsburg is approximately 22.67°C. The average water temperature in January on Fishing Creek near Bloomsburg is approximately 1.92°C. The average water temperature of Fishing Creek for every water temperature measurement on the creek near Bloomsburg between 2002 and 2012 is approximately 12.03°C.
