= Megazol =

Chemical compound

Clinical data
- ATC code: None

Identifiers
- IUPAC name: 5-(1-methyl-5-nitro-1H-imidazol-2-yl)-1,3,4-thiadiazol-2-amine
- CAS Number: 19622-55-0
- ChemSpider: 27598
- UNII: VQ8UH664ZJ
- CompTox Dashboard (EPA): DTXSID50173298

Chemical and physical data
- Formula: C_{6}H_{6}N_{6}O_{2}S
- Molar mass: 226.21 g·mol^{−1}
- 3D model (JSmol): Interactive image
- SMILES: Cn1c(cnc1c2nnc(s2)N)[N+](=O)[O-]

Megazol (CL 64855) is a nitroimidazole based drug that cures some protozoan infections.

A study of nitroimidazoles found the drug extremely effective against T. cruzi and T. brucei which cause Chagas disease and African sleeping sickness, respectively. The drug is considerably more effective than standard benznidazole therapy (for Chagas) which is considered the gold standard. This is despite that other nitroimidazoles proved ineffective against these pathogens.

== See also ==
- Benznidazole
- Chagas disease
- African sleeping sickness
- Nitroimidazole
- Trypanosoma cruzi
- Trypanosoma brucei
