= C5H7N3O2 =

The molecular formula C_{5}H_{7}N_{3}O_{2} (molar mass: 141.13 g/mol, exact mass: 141.0538 u) may refer to:

- dimetridazole
- 5-Hydroxymethylcytosine (5hmC)
