= ATCvet code QP51 =

Veterinary medical products classification subgroup

ATCvet code QP51 Antiprotozoals is a therapeutic subgroup of the Anatomical Therapeutic Chemical Classification System for veterinary medicinal products, a system of alphanumeric codes developed by the World Health Organization (WHO) for the classification of drugs and other medical products for veterinary use. Subgroup QP51 is part of the anatomical group QP Antiparasitic products, insecticides and repellents.

National versions of the ATC classification may include additional codes not present in this list, which follows the WHO version.

== QP51A Agents against protozoal diseases ==
=== QP51AA Nitroimidazole derivatives ===
QP51AA02 Tinidazole
QP51AA03 Ornidazole
QP51AA04 Azanidazole
QP51AA05 Propenidazole
QP51AA06 Nimorazole
QP51AA07 Dimetridazole
QP51AA10 Ipronidazole

=== QP51AB Antimony compounds ===
QP51AB02 Sodium stibogluconate

=== QP51AC Nitrofuran derivatives ===
QP51AC01 Nifurtimox
QP51AC02 Nitrofural

=== QP51AD Arsenic compounds ===
QP51AD01 Arsthinol
QP51AD02 Difetarsone
QP51AD03 Glycobiarsol
QP51AD04 Melarsoprol
QP51AD05 Acetarsol
QP51AD53 Glycobiarsol, combinations

=== QP51AE Carbanilides ===
QP51AE02 Suramin sodium
QP51AE03 Nicarbazine

=== QP51AF Aromatic diamidines ===
QP51AF03 Phenamidine

=== QP51AG Sulfonamides, plain and in combinations ===
QP51AG01 Sulfadimidine
QP51AG30 Combinations of sulfonamides
QP51AG51 Sulfadimidine, combinations
QP51AG53 Sulfaquinoxaline, combinations

=== QP51AX Other antiprotozoal agents ===
QP51AX01 Chiniofon
QP51AX02 Emetine
QP51AX03 Phanquinone
QP51AX04 Mepacrine
QP51AX05 Nifursol
QP51AX11 Arprinocid
QP51AX12 Dinitolmide
QP51AX17 Ethopabate
QP51AX18 Diaveridine
QP51AX23 Fumagillin
QP51AX30 Combinations of other protozoal agents

== QP51B Agents against coccidiosis ==
=== QP51BA Sulfonamides, plain and in combinations against coccidiosis ===
QP51BA01 Sulfadimethoxine
QP51BA02 Sulfaquinoxaline
QP51BA03 Sulfaclozine

=== QP51BB Ionophores against coccidiosis ===
QP51BB01 Salinomycin
QP51BB02 Lasalocid
QP51BB03 Monensin
QP51BB04 Narasin
QP51BB05 Maduramicin
QP51BB54 Narasin, combinations

=== QP51BC Triazines against coccidiosis ===
QP51BC01 Toltrazuril
QP51BC02 Clazuril
QP51BC03 Diclazuril
QP51BC04 Ponazuril
QP51BC51 Toltrazuril, combinations

=== QP51BX Other agents against coccidiosis ===
QP51BX01 Halofuginone
QP51BX02 Amprolium
QP51BX03 Robenidine
QP51BX04 Decoquinate
QP51BX05 Clopidol
QP51BX52 Amprolium, combinations
QP51BX56 Pyrimethamine, combinations

== QP51C Agents against amoebiosis and histomonosis ==
=== QP51CA Nitroimidazole derivatives against amoebiosis and histomonosis ===
QP51CA01 Metronidazole
QP51CA02 Ronidazole
QP51CA03 Carnidazole

=== QP51CX Other agents against amoebiosis and histomonosis ===
QP51CX01 Aminonitrothiazol

== QP51D Agents against leishmaniosis and trypanosomosis ==
=== QP51DF Aromatic diamidines against leishmaniosis and trypanosomosis ===
QP51DF01 Diminazen
QP51DF02 Pentamidine

=== QP51DX Other agents against leishmaniosis and trypanosomosis ===
QP51DX01 Meglumine antimonate
QP51DX02 Melarsamin
QP51DX03 Homidium
QP51DX04 Isometamidium
QP51DX05 Quinapyramine
QP51DX06 Domperidone
QP51DX07 Miltefosine

== QP51E Agents against babesiosis and theileriosis ==
=== QP51EX Other agents against babesiosis and theileriosis ===
QP51EX01 Imidocarb
QP51EX02 Parvaquone
QP51EX03 Buparvaquone

== QP51X Other antiprotozoal agents ==
Empty group
