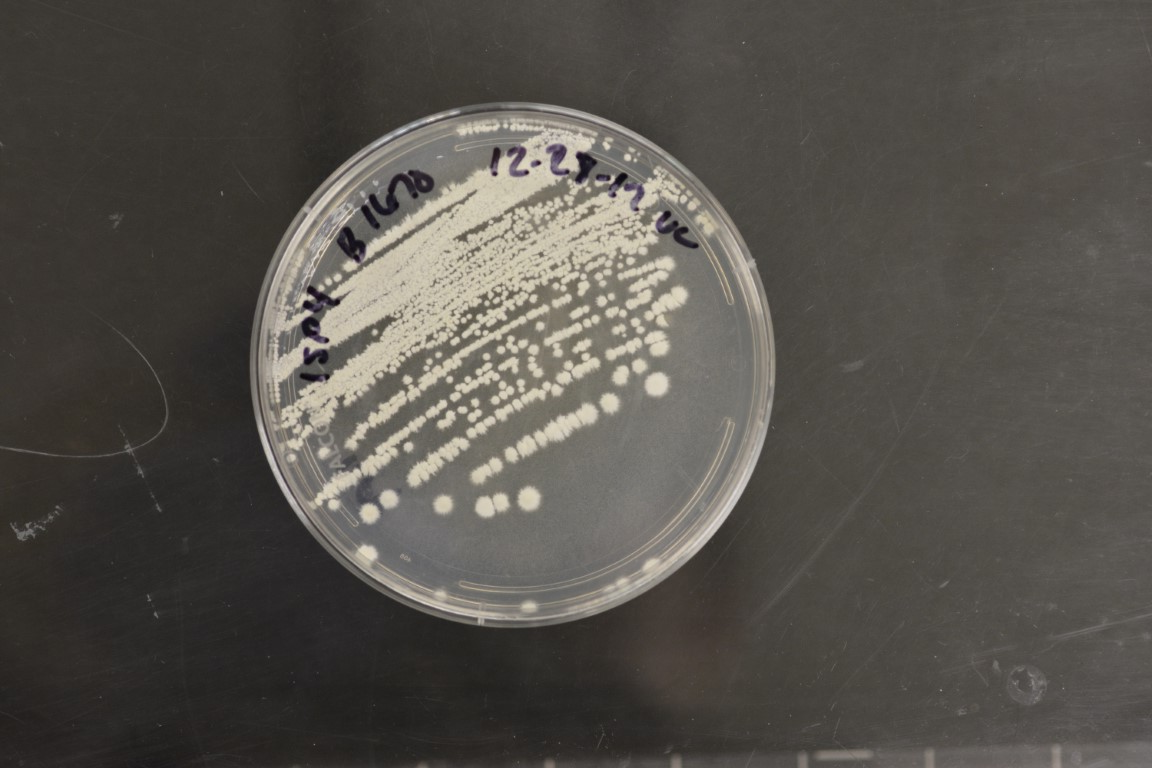

Scientific classification
- Domain: Bacteria
- Kingdom: Bacillati
- Phylum: Actinomycetota
- Class: Actinomycetes
- Order: Streptomycetales
- Family: Streptomycetaceae
- Genus: Streptomyces
- Species: S. eurocidicus

Binomial name
- Streptomyces eurocidicus (Okami et al. 1954) Witt and Stackebrandt 1991

Type strain
- 549-A1, AS 4.1086, ATCC 27428, BCRC 12424, CBS 792.72, CCRC 12424, CECT 3259, CEST 3259, CGMCC 4.1086, CIP 108155, DSM 40604, DSMZ 40604, IFO 13491, IMET 43412, IPV 1996, ISP 5604, JCM 4029, JCM 4749, KCC S-0029, KCC S-0749, KCCS-0029, KCTC 9884, MTCC 2531, NBRC 13491, NCB 264, NIHJ 267, NIHJ 276, NIHJ 549-A1, NRRL B-1676, NRRL-ISP 5604, RIA 1452, RIA 733, VKM Ac-903

Synonyms
- "Streptomyces albireticuli" Nakazawa 1955; Streptomyces albireticuli (Nakazawa 1955) Witt and Stackebrandt 1991; "Streptomyces eurocidicus" Okami et al. 1954; Streptoverticillium albireticuli (Nakazawa 1955) Locci et al. 1969 (Approved Lists 1980); Streptoverticillium eurocidicum (Okami et al. 1954) Locci et al. 1969 (Approved Lists 1980); "Verticillomyces eurocidicus" (Okami et al. 1954) Shinobu 1965

= Streptomyces eurocidicus =

Species of bacterium

Streptomyces eurocidicus is a bacterium species from the genus of Streptomyces. Streptomyces eurocidicus produces azomycin, eurocidin C, eurocidin D, eurocidin E, tertiomycine A, 2-nitroimidazole and tertiomycine B.

== See also ==
- List of Streptomyces species
