= C9H14N4O3 =

The molecular formula C_{9}H_{14}N_{4}O_{3} (molar mass: 226.24 g/mol, exact mass: 226.1066 u) may refer to:

- Carnosine
- Nimorazole
