= Ipronidazole =

Chemical compound

Clinical data
- Other names: Ipropran
- ATCvet code: QP51AA10 (WHO)

Identifiers
- IUPAC name: 1-methyl-5-nitro-2-propan-2-ylimidazole
- CAS Number: 14885-29-1
- PubChem CID: 26951
- ChemSpider: 25097
- UNII: 045BU63E23
- CompTox Dashboard (EPA): DTXSID7046839
- ECHA InfoCard: 100.035.401

Chemical and physical data
- Formula: C_{7}H_{11}N_{3}O_{2}
- Molar mass: 169.184 g·mol^{−1}
- 3D model (JSmol): Interactive image
- SMILES: [O-][N+](=O)c1cnc(n1C)C(C)C
- InChI: InChI=1S/C7H11N3O2/c1-5(2)7-8-4-6(9(7)3)10(11)12/h4-5H,1-3H3; Key:NTAFJUSDNOSFFY-UHFFFAOYSA-N

Ipronidazole is an antiprotozoal drug of the nitroimidazole class used in veterinary medicine. It is used for the treatment of histomoniasis in turkeys and for swine dysentery.
