= Carnidazole =

Chemical compound

Clinical data
- Trade names: Spartrix
- Other names: R 25831
- AHFS/Drugs.com: International Drug Names
- Routes of administration: Oral
- ATCvet code: QP51CA03 (WHO)

Identifiers
- IUPAC name: O-Methyl [2-(2-methyl-5-nitro-1H-imidazol-1-yl)ethyl]carbamothioate
- CAS Number: 42116-76-7
- PubChem CID: 3032998
- ChemSpider: 2297829
- UNII: RH5KI819JG
- ChEMBL: ChEMBL135000
- CompTox Dashboard (EPA): DTXSID40194957
- ECHA InfoCard: 100.050.585

Chemical and physical data
- Formula: C_{8}H_{12}N_{4}O_{3}S
- Molar mass: 244.27 g·mol^{−1}
- 3D model (JSmol): Interactive image
- Melting point: 124.4 °C (255.9 °F)
- SMILES: [O-] [N+](=O)c1cnc(n1CCNC(=S)OC)C
- InChI: InChI=1S/C8H12N4O3S/c1-6-10-5-7(12(13)14)11(6)4-3-9-8(16)15-2/h5H,3-4H2,1-2H3,(H,9,16); Key:OVEVHVURWWTPFC-UHFFFAOYSA-N

Carnidazole (trade names Spartrix, Pantrix, Gambamix) is an antiprotozoal drug of the nitroimidazole class used in veterinary medicine. It is used to treat Trichomonas infection in pigeons.
