= Glycobiarsol =

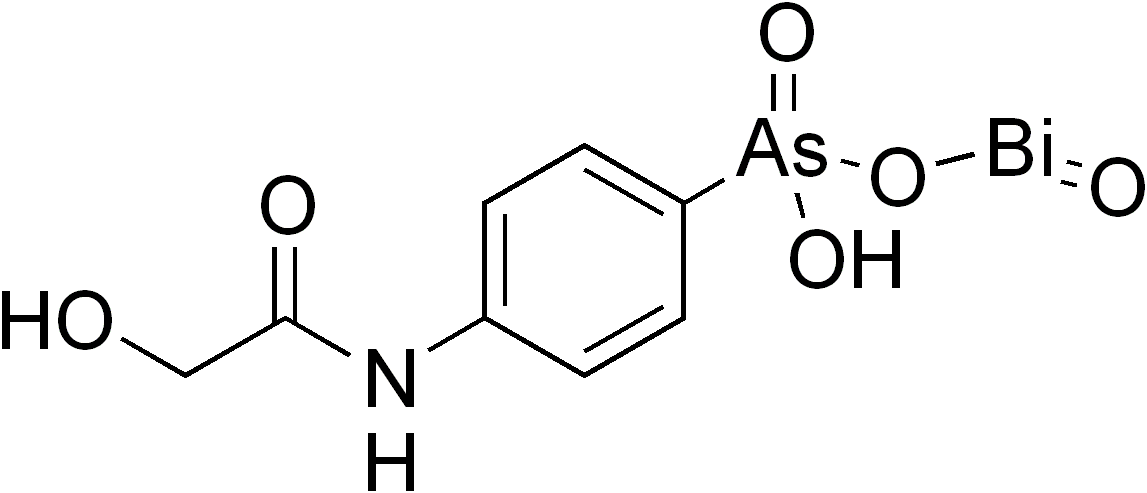

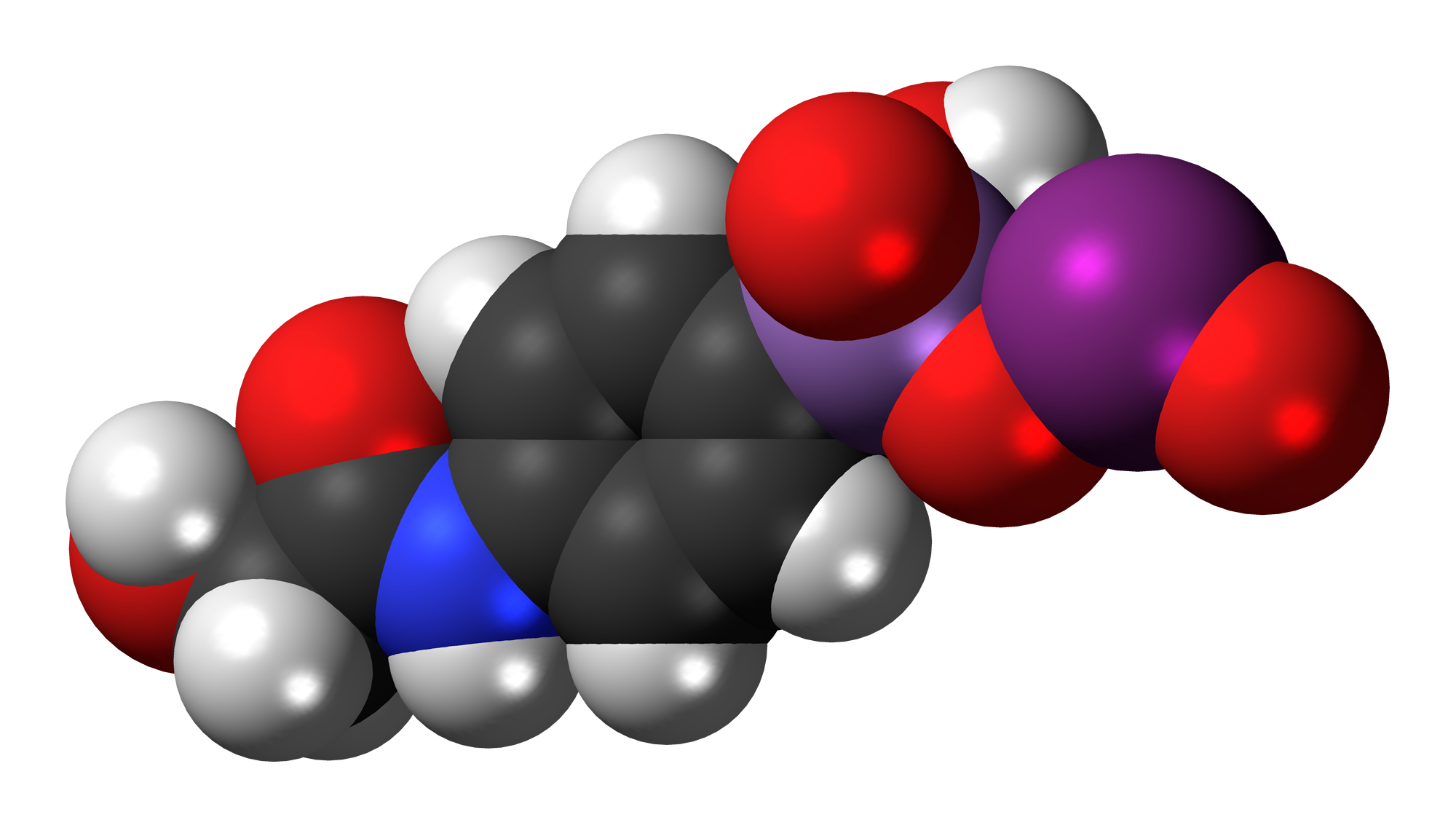

Names
- Preferred IUPAC name Oxobismuthanyl hydrogen [4-(2-hydroxyacetamido)phenyl]arsonate
- Other names [4-[(2-Hydroxyacetyl)amino]phenyl]-oxobismuthanyl-oxyarsinic acid

Identifiers
CAS Number	116-49-4
3D model (JSmol)	Interactive image
ChemSpider	10669861
ECHA InfoCard	100.003.767
EC Number	204-143-1
KEGG	D07358
PubChem CID	16682839
UNII	E3U8347QWJ
CompTox Dashboard (EPA)	DTXSID1048754
- InChI: InChI=1S/C8H10AsNO5.Bi.O/c11-5-8(12)10-7-3-1-6(2-4-7)9(13,14)15;;/h1-4,11H,5H2,(H,10,12)(H2,13,14,15);;/q;+1;/p-1 Key: FATAHBJTOKXSDH-UHFFFAOYSA-M
- SMILES: OCC(=O)NC1=CC=C(C=C1)[As](O)(=O)O[Bi]=O

Properties
Chemical formula	C_{8}H_{9}AsBiNO_{6}
Molar mass	499.063 g·mol^{−1}

Pharmacology
ATC code	P01AR03 (WHO) QP51AD03 (WHO) QP51AD53 (WHO)
- Except where otherwise noted, data are given for materials in their standard state (at 25 °C [77 °F], 100 kPa). Infobox references

Glycobiarsol (trade name Milibis) is an organometallic antiprotozoal agent that has been used in humans as well as in dogs.
