= Arprinocid =

Chemical compound

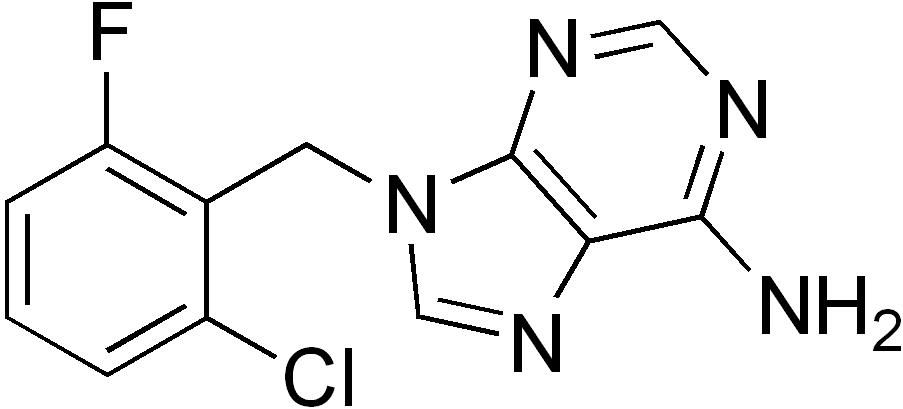

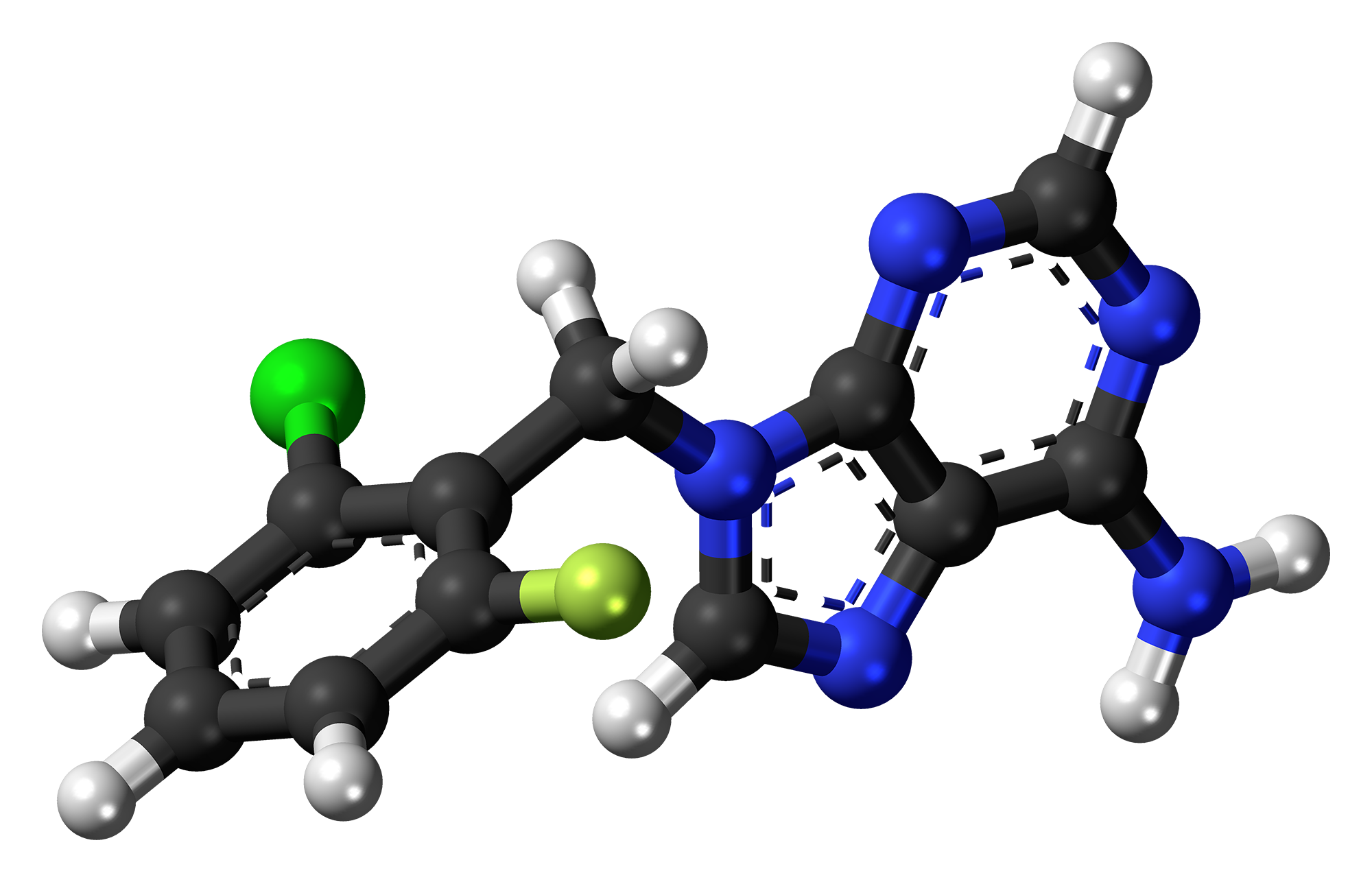

Clinical data
- ATCvet code: QP51AX11 (WHO)

Identifiers
- IUPAC name: 9-[(2-chloro-6-fluorophenyl)methyl]-6-purinamine
- CAS Number: 55779-18-5
- PubChem CID: 41574
- ChemSpider: 37936
- UNII: 6A0XTA8ZUH
- KEGG: D02987
- ChEMBL: ChEMBL321993
- CompTox Dashboard (EPA): DTXSID3057773
- ECHA InfoCard: 100.054.362

Chemical and physical data
- Formula: C_{12}H_{9}ClFN_{5}
- Molar mass: 277.69 g·mol^{−1}
- 3D model (JSmol): Interactive image
- SMILES: C1=CC(=C(C(=C1)Cl)CN2C=NC3=C2N=CN=C3N)F
- InChI: InChI=1S/C12H9ClFN5/c13-8-2-1-3-9(14)7(8)4-19-6-18-10-11(15)16-5-17-12(10)19/h1-3,5-6H,4H2,(H2,15,16,17); Key:NAPNOSFRRMHNBJ-UHFFFAOYSA-N

Arprinocid is a coccidiostat (or more likely a coccidiocide, i.e. a drug killing Coccidia parasites) used in veterinary medicine.

== Synthesis ==
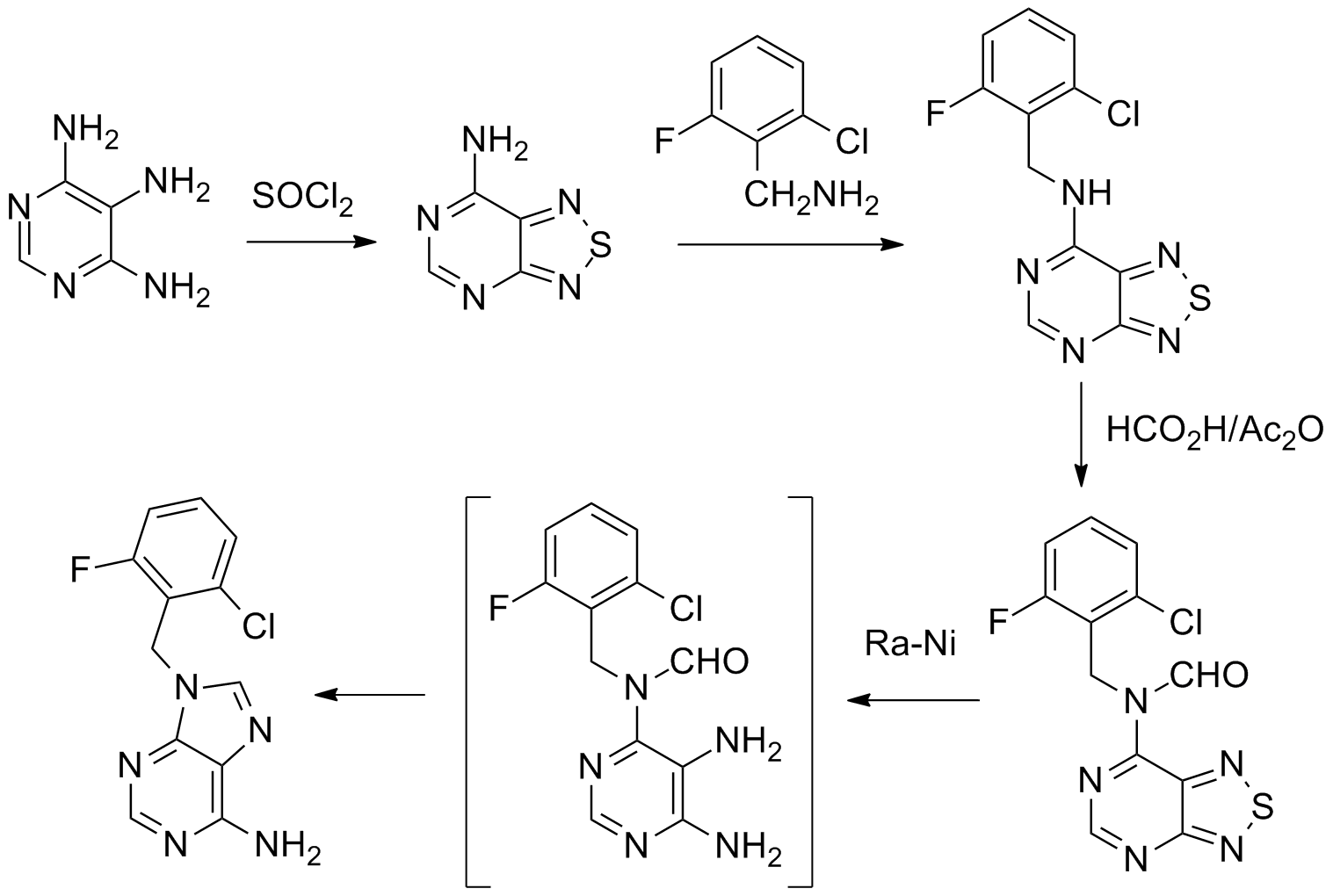
Arprinocid synthesis: Merck & Co. R. J. Tull, G. D. Hartman, and L. M. Weinstock, U.S. patent 4,098,787 (1978).
