= Nicarbazin =

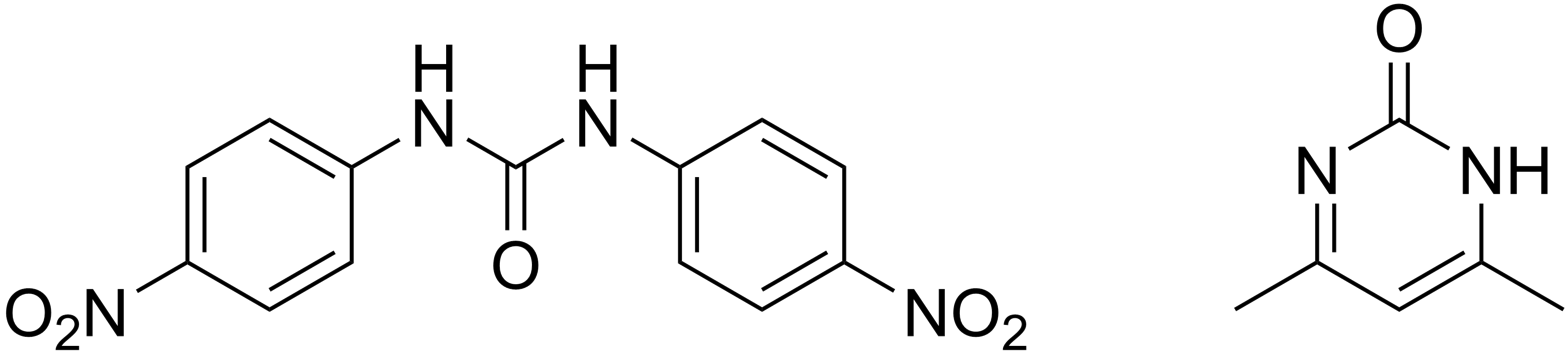

Names
- Preferred IUPAC name N,N′-Bis(4-nitrophenyl)urea—4,6-dimethylpyrimidin-2(1H)-one (1/1)

Identifiers
CAS Number	330-95-0
3D model (JSmol)	Interactive image
ChEMBL	ChEMBL95855
ChemSpider	9135
ECHA InfoCard	100.005.782
PubChem CID	9507
UNII	11P9NUA12U
CompTox Dashboard (EPA)	DTXSID6034762
- InChI: InChI=1S/C13H10N4O5.C6H8N2O/c18-13(14-9-1-5-11(6-2-9)16(19)20)15-10-3-7-12(8-4-10)17(21)22;1-4-3-5(2)8-6(9)7-4/h1-8H,(H2,14,15,18);3H,1-2H3,(H,7,8,9) Key: UKHWDRMMMYWSFL-UHFFFAOYSA-N; InChI=1/C13H10N4O5.C6H8N2O/c18-13(14-9-1-5-11(6-2-9)16(19)20)15-10-3-7-12(8-4-10)17(21)22;1-4-3-5(2)8-6(9)7-4/h1-8H,(H2,14,15,18);3H,1-2H3,(H,7,8,9) Key: UKHWDRMMMYWSFL-UHFFFAOYAE
- SMILES: O=C1/N=C(\C=C(/N1)C)C.[O-][N+](=O)c1ccc(cc1)NC(=O)Nc2ccc([N+]([O-])=O)cc2

Properties
Chemical formula	C_{19}H_{18}N_{6}O_{6}
Molar mass	426.38 g/mol
Appearance	light yellow powder
Density	0.5 g/mL
Melting point	265-275 C
Solubility in water	slightly soluble in dimethylsulphoxide (DMSO) and dimethylformamide (DMF); insoluble in water and methanol

Pharmacology
ATCvet code	QP51AE03 (WHO)

Hazards
- Lethal dose or concentration (LD, LC)
LC_{50} (median concentration)	>0.147 mg/L in rats
- Except where otherwise noted, data are given for materials in their standard state (at 25 °C [77 °F], 100 kPa). verify (what is ?) Infobox references

Nicarbazin is a coccidiostat used on meat chickens. It is also used as a contraceptive for population control of Canada geese and feral pigeons.

It is also a wide-spectrum anti-parasitic drug approved for veterinary use, effective on Toxocara canis, Toxascaris leonina, Ancylostoma caninum, Uncinaria stenocephala, Trichuris vulpis, Dipylidium caninum, and Taenia sp. and Mesocestoides sp.. Known brand names for specific countries include:

- Carbigran (the United States)
- Ceva Nicarbazin (South Africa)
- Cycarb (New Zealand)
- Keymix (Australia)
- Koffogran (South Africa)
- Kofozin (Israel)
- Nicarb 25% (the United States)
- Nicarbazin (Israel)
- Nicarbazin Elanco (the United States)
- Nicarbmax 100% (New Zealand)
- Nicarmix (the United States)
- Ovistop (Italy and Costa Rica)
- OvoControl (the United States)
- PhiCarb (Australia)
- R-12 (Belgium)

From the chemical point of view, nicarbazin is an equimolar complex formed by 1,3 - bis (4- nitrophenyl) urea and 4-6 dimethyl-2- (1H) - pyrimidinone also called 4,4'-dinitrocarbanilide (DNC) and 2-hydroxy - 4,6 dimethylpyrimidine (HDP).

The DNC represents the biologically active part of the complex, but to be absorbed it must be bound to the HDP. Because of its hydrophobic nature, the DNC alone is poorly absorbed and has a limited "biological availability" so, following oral administration, it would be eliminated without being absorbed. The DNC therefore requires HDP to be absorbed and to reach a plasma level that allows an effect in the target species.

Following oral administration, nicarbazin rapidly dissociates in vivo into its two HDP and DNC components, which follow different routes of excretion: 95% of HDP is rapidly eliminated with urine, while DNC remains longer and is eliminated predominantly with feces.

Metabolism and depletion of the two components have been studied extensively with the use of carbon-14-labeled nicarbazin. Following oral administration, nicarbazin rapidly dissociates in vivo into its two components HDP and DNC, which are absorbed through the intestine, then passing into the blood, and following different routes of excretion. The HDP is excreted more rapidly than the DNC, mainly through the kidneys via the urine, while the DNC is absorbed more rapidly than the HDP and is excreted more slowly than the latter through the liver, via the faeces. No significant residue of either component is noticeable in any fabric after 7 days. DNC accumulates in eggs and normally the concentration of DNC in eggs is less than 5 ppm.

The two components HDP and DNC do not undergo metabolism in vivo and in vitro, except for the formation of derivatives structurally similar to nitroaniline. However, this possibility appears extremely remote, achievable only in the laboratory, in particular chemical-physical conditions (high temperature in a strongly acid environment).

Of the two components of the nicarbazin molecule, the DNC takes on a significance from a toxicological point of view as it remains longer in the body. The DNC molecule was therefore considered as a marker compound in residue studies.

== Activities ==
Nicarbazin, present long enough in the world market, is the product of first choice as coccidiostatic, due to its safe use, in the breeding of broiler. Known brand names for specific countries include: Carbigran (United States); Ceva Nicarbazin (South Africa); Cycarb (New Zealand); Keymix (Australia); Koffogran (South Africa); Kofozin (Israel); Nicarb 25% (United States); Nicarbazin (Israel); Nicarbazin Elanco (United States); Nicarbmax 100% (New Zealand); Nicarmix (United States); PhiCarb (Australia)

The use of nicarbazin as a coccidiostat has shown, even if in a completely reversible form, an inhibiting effect on the productive and reproductive functions of laying hens, with a consequent reduction in egg production and their weight as well as a decrease in hatching capacity. The depressive effects on ovulation found in poultry have formed the rational basis for the development of some preparation, containing nicarbazin, used for birth control in the population of stray pigeons. Known brand names for specific countries include: Ovistop (Italy); OvoControl (United States); R-12 (Belgium)

Nicarbazin is also a wide-spectrum anti-parasitic drug approved for veterinary use, effective on Toxocara canis, Toxascaris leonina, Ancylostoma caninum, Uncinaria stenocephala, Trichuris vulpis, Dipylidium caninum, and Taenia sp. and Mesocestoides sp..

=== Coccidiostatic activity ===
Nicarbazin is active on some species of Emeria with different sensitivity. Unlike other coccidiostats, nicarbazin rarely presents resistance phenomena towards the most common coccidioses such as those supported by Emeria tenella.

The dose of nicarbazin generally used in the prevention of cecal and intestinal coccidiosis of chickens is 125 ppm in feed.

Nicarbazin is often used in combination with ionophoric antibiotics to increase the spectrum of activity and reduce the phenomenon of resistance.

=== Effects on reproductive function in chickens ===
Administration of nicarbazin in laying hens was associated with a reduction in egg production and weight. The minimum dose that proved to be able to produce these effects was 50 ppm on egg weight and 70 ppm on egg production. The intensity of these effects was correlated with the dose and duration of the treatment period. Treatment with nicarbazin for a week, at a concentration of 125 ppm, reduced egg production by 50%, while, at a dose of 400 ppm, egg production was totally suppressed.

The mechanism by which egg production is reduced appears to be the result of reduced hypothalamic sensitivity to exogenous progesterone, while the ability of the pituitary to respond to the lutein excretion factor (LHRF) remains intact.

It was hypothesized that nicarbazin could not only prevent the deposition of the constituents of the yolk in the ovary, but that it was also able to counteract the stimulating function of the hypothalamus, probably due to an inadequate hormonal arrangement. Injection of LHRF in nicarbazin-treated animals results in an immediate and elevated plasma LH concentration due to the previously accumulated LH pituitary gland due to the lack of hypothalamic stimulus.

Recent studies have shown that the mechanism of action of nicarbazin is related to the inhibition of sperm receptor sites ZP3.

These effects on egg production and weight have proven to be reversible. Normal production resumes from one to three weeks after the end of nicarbazin treatment. The eggs return to normal size within about ten days.

=== Reduction of egg hatching ===
Nicarbazin administered to hens has no effect on fertility or the survival of chicks. The main effect is the increase in embryo mortality in the first seven days.

The mechanism of action of nicarbazin requires that the bird ingest the bait in sufficient quantity to reach a blood concentration such as DNC that can subsequently allow its deposition in the yolk of the eggs being formed. It takes 5–7 days to reach the blood level which allows absorption into the yolk. In the laying hen, as in almost all birds, the egg takes about 14 days to develop before being deposited. During the development of the egg the last 5–7 days are of particular importance, a period in which the yolk reaches its maximum development, the albumen and the shell are completed and the egg is deposited. Interference with egg hatching is achieved only if the target animal consumes an effective dose of bait during this period of egg development.

The minimum dose level that affects hatching is 10 to 20 ppm. Increasing the dosage increases the effects on hatching. At 20 ppm the hatching capacity is reduced by about 20%, from 50 to 125 ppm by about 50%. The eggs of hens treated with 700 ppm of nicarbazin do not hatch.

The hatching returns to normal from 7 to 21 days after the withdrawal of nicarbazin.

=== Effects on the reproductive function of the pigeon ===
The uncontrolled numerical development of pigeon colonies in urban areas entails health problems for humans and other animals and puts the integrity of the building and monumental heritage of cities at risk.

The limiting effects on reproductive capacity, which occurred in laying hens following treatment with nicarbazin, suggested the use of this compound for pigeon birth control.

In a study conducted in 1993, 40 pairs of pigeons were used, subdivided into 4 groups and treated with nicarbazin medicated feed at doses of 0, 50, 230 and 400 ppm for a period of 120 days

100% of fertile eggs with birth of as many chicks in the control group (0 ppm), they corresponded fertility rates of 33.3% to 50 ppm, of 43.3% to 230 ppm, while fertility was zero at the dosage higher (400 ppm).

The results obtained appear to be linked to the morphofunctional modifications shown in the reproductive apparatus of the sacrificed animals even if their size does not seem proportional to the dosages. The treatment does not seem to have changed the overall health status of the animals. The biochemical and anatomopathological investigations have excluded anatomical damage to the doses used, while the reversibility of the functional modifications of the reproductive apparatus has been confirmed.

A study, conducted by Chelazzi in the district of Florence, with the aim of evaluating the effects of nicarbazin on the number of pigeons in different areas, involved treatment of the animals with maize grains added with nicarbazin (800 ppm) during the period between the end of February and the beginning of October, with a daily dose of 10 g/head for 5 days a week.

The results obtained clearly showed that the administration of nicarbazin led to a reduction in the number of colony-forming pigeons without the presence of lethal effects.

Bursi, in field tests carried out during the years 1997–1998, underlines how the administration of a feed consisting of corn grains coated on the surface with nicarbazin at a concentration of 800 ppm, from February to October with a dosage of 30 g/head/day (24 mg of nicarbazin/head/day) to pigeons found in the urban centers of Parma, Forlì, Carpi and San Felice s / P, allows to achieve interesting results concerning the activity of this active ingredient.

In fact the censuses carried out in the three months following the treatment, with the same methodology used before the treatment, have shown a significant reduction of stray pigeons within the urban environment, which concerns first of all the "novels" of the year, and a mortality value of the single colonies normal for the species and the environmental conditions, without toxic effects due to the treatment with nicarbazin, that the necroscopic and bacteriological investigations carried out on the seriously ill or deceased animals during the study attributed instead to infectious diseases typical of the species

Finally, Ferri administered to 552 colonies, for a total of 85562 pigeons, a compound consisting of covered maize grains with nicarbazin (800 ppm), at a dose of 8-10 g/head/day for 5 days per week during the period March–October in the years 1990–2007. The author has observed, through checks carried out before and after the treatment, that the effect of nicarbazin on the numerical density of pigeons determines a constant reduction of 40–70% of the colony number, with peaks that can reach 85–90 %.

A confirmation of the previous observations regarding the effects of nicarbazin on the reproductive activity of pigeons (Columba livia) derives from the results obtained by Avery et al. The treatment of 11 pairs of pigeons in captivity with a feed containing nicarbazin (5000 ppm) for 4 hours a day, administered at a dose of 40 g/pair without other foods, interferes with the reproductive capacity of the animals.

In particular, the authors pointed out that egg production was not affected, but only 9 of the 22 eggs produced opened up, with a 59% reduction compared to the pre-treatment period in which each of the 11 couples under study produced 2 chicks. In the recovery phase, when the processed feed was removed, the 11 pairs produced 18 chicks. All the chicks born during the study appeared healthy and normal and there were no cases of mortality among the adult couples. Therefore, the authors have considered nicarbazin an effective and safe means to reduce the hatching of stray pigeons with a consequent numerical reduction of their populations.

== Toxicity ==
The acute toxicity of nicarbazin was low in rodents, with LD50 values >25000 mg/kg body weight in the mouse and >10,000 mg/kg in the rat. The individual components also showed low oral toxicity: the LD50 values in the mouse were 4000 and >18000 mg/kg of body weight for the respective components pyrimidinone and phenylurea. The non-toxic nature of Nicarbazin has been studied extensively and is well documented in the literature. After more than 50 years of research, the only constant side effect resulting from the ingestion of nicarbazin in birds is the reduction in the ability to hatch eggs. The phenomenon is related to the dose and the time of exposure. The literature also reveals that nicarbazin does not create accumulation and that reproduction returns to normal 7–10 days after stopping the intake. The acute toxicity values of nicarbazin in sensitive birds are shown in the following table: Table 2 - Acute toxicity values of species susceptible to nicarbazin

Specie	Toxic level
Mallard CL 50 = 3680 ppm	CL 50 = 3680 ppm in the total diet
Virginia Colander (Colinus virgilianus)	CL 50 > 5720 ppm in the total diet DL 50 > 2250 mg/kg/pv

As regards the symptoms caused by high doses of nicarbazin in chickens, as a consequence of poisoning caused by high doses of nicarbazin (2500 ppm) in the feed, after 8 hours from ingestion, the broilers presented a severe dyspnea, a permanent decubitus with a subsequent extension of the leg and wing and an increase in body temperature, with lethal results for some subjects. Hyperthermia, observed in chicken after ingestion of a high nicarbazin dose, was confirmed in a study performed by Beers et al., the authors stated that a concentration of 125 ppm of nicarbazin in the feed is able to increase the body temperature of the birds, subjected to thermal stress, determining important changes in the acid-base balance, in the blood lactate and in the heart rate. Taken together, the information published on nicarbazin reports that it is a compound with non-toxic effects. The following table gives a summary of the data regarding the acute and maximum doses of nicarbazin tolerated by some mammals.

Specie	Single dose DL50 g / kg	! Single dose DL50 ppm	! Maximum dose tolerated in the diet
Mouse	>10	>80,000	
Rat	>10	>80,00	1,600 ppm for 177 days
Dog	>5	>40,000	5g / kg / day for 165 days (40,000 ppm)
Sheep			4,000 ppm in the diet for 1 year
Calf			1,600 ppm in milk for 42 days
Guinea pig	>5	>40,000	
Rabbit	>5	>40,000	

The data published by the Joint FAO/WHO Expert Committee on Food Additives (JECFA) establish a No-observed-adverse-effect level (NOEL) for the rat and the dog, based on a 2-year study, on reproduction and teratology studies, ranging from 200 mg/kg to 400 mg/kg for the Codex Alimentarius food safety standard. These values, translated with diet levels from 1600 ppm to 3200 ppm, correspond to the data of Ott. The poor toxicity of nicarbazin after repeated treatments is confirmed by studies carried out on rats and dogs. A two-year study was conducted in the dog who was given a diet containing phenylurea and pyrimidinone at daily doses of 0 + 0; 60 + 20; 180 + 60; 600 + 200 mg/kg. Serum alanine aminotransferase (ALT) was increased in several animals, while in a dog a proliferation of bile ducts was observed at a dose of 600 + 200 mg/kg of the phenylurea + pyrimidinone mixture. No other effects due to treatment have been reported. The NOEL was 180 + 60 mg/kg. A 2-year study was conducted in the rat with a diet containing phenylurea and pyrimidone at daily doses, respectively, in mg / kg of body weight of 0 + 0; 50 + 17; 150 + 50; 300 + 100. No toxic effects related to treatment or increased incidence of tumors have been observed. The highest dose of the 300 + 100 mg/kg mixture was considered NOEL. A toxicity test of reproductive function at three generations was conducted in the rat fed on a diet containing the phenylurea + pyrimidinone mixture at the daily doses, in mg/kg of body weight of 0 + 0; 50 + 17; 150 + 50; 300 + 100. At the highest dosage sporadic reductions in the number of fetuses and a reduction in the increase in body weight of infants during lactation were observed. These effects were not found in the majority of animals. It is concluded that nicarbazin has no effect on the reproductive system in the rat. An organogenesis study was conducted in the rat by administering nicarbazin gavage at doses of: 0, 70, 200, or 600 mg/kg of body weight on days 7–17 of gestation. At the highest dose a reduction in body weight and food consumption was observed in females treated with mortality of 7/25 animals. At this dose there was a delay in fetal development. Some fetal anomalies have been observed such as hydronephrosis, and hyperplastic and inclined ribs. No teratogenic forms were observed. The NOEL was considered at a dose of 200 mg/kg. In the United States, the Environmental Protection Agency considers nicarbazin "practically non-toxic" by comparing its toxicity to that of sugar.
