= Propenidazole =

Chemical compound

Clinical data
- ATC code: G01AF14 (WHO) P01AB05 (WHO) QP51AA05 (WHO)

Identifiers
- IUPAC name: ethyl (2E)-2-[(1-methyl-5-nitro-1H-imidazol-2-yl)methylene]-3-oxobutanoate
- CAS Number: 76448-31-2
- PubChem CID: 6446788
- ChemSpider: 4950302
- UNII: F0O89MB7QE
- KEGG: D07430
- ChEMBL: ChEMBL1788390
- CompTox Dashboard (EPA): DTXSID60227256

Chemical and physical data
- Formula: C_{11}H_{13}N_{3}O_{5}
- Molar mass: 267.241 g·mol^{−1}
- 3D model (JSmol): Interactive image
- SMILES: O=C(OCC)\C(=C\c1ncc(n1C)[N+]([O-])=O)C(=O)C
- InChI: InChI=1S/C11H13N3O5/c1-4-19-11(16)8(7(2)15)5-9-12-6-10(13(9)3)14(17)18/h5-6H,4H2,1-3H3/b8-5+; Key:GCHKUUOPYMFGEY-VMPITWQZSA-N

Propenidazole is an antiinfective imidazole derivative used in gynecology.
