= Dimetridazole =

Chemical compound

Clinical data
- AHFS/Drugs.com: International Drug Names
- ATCvet code: QP51AA07 (WHO)

Identifiers
- IUPAC name: 1,2-dimethyl-5-nitro-1H-imidazole
- CAS Number: 551-92-8
- PubChem CID: 3090
- ChemSpider: 2980
- UNII: K59P7XNB8X
- KEGG: D07855
- ChEMBL: ChEMBL38938
- CompTox Dashboard (EPA): DTXSID5020497
- ECHA InfoCard: 100.008.184

Chemical and physical data
- Formula: C_{5}H_{7}N_{3}O_{2}
- Molar mass: 141.130 g·mol^{−1}
- 3D model (JSmol): Interactive image
- SMILES: Cc1ncc([N](=O)=O)n1C
- InChI: InChI=1S/C5H7N3O2/c1-4-6-3-5(7(4)2)8(9)10/h3H,1-2H3; Key:IBXPYPUJPLLOIN-UHFFFAOYSA-N

Dimetridazole is a drug that combats protozoan infections. It is a nitroimidazole class drug. It used to be commonly added to poultry feed. This led to it being found in eggs. Because of suspicions of it being carcinogenic its use has been legally limited but it is still found in the eggs. It is now banned as a livestock feed additive in many jurisdictions, for example in the European Union, Canada. and the United States. In the US, the Food and Drug Administration bans it for extralabel use

== See also ==
- Metronidazole
- Nimorazole
