= Peter Tishler =

American physician and academic researcher (1937–2021)

Peter Tishler ca. 2002

Peter Verveer Tishler (July 18, 1937 – January 18, 2021) was a researcher in human genetics and orphan diseases, educator, and clinician especially in the areas of genetic diseases, including polycystic kidney disease, chronic obstructive pulmonary disease, Fabry disease, and the porphyrias.

== Biography ==
Tishler was born on July 18, 1937, in Boston, Massachusetts to Max Tishler and Elizabeth M. Verveer, and grew up in New Jersey. He died January 18, 2021, in Watertown, Massachusetts.

Tishler attended public schools and Harvard College where he majored in biochemistry. He wrote his senior thesis on carboxypeptidase, in the lab of Dr. C.J. Fu at the Jimmy Fund, graduating cum laude in 1959.

Tishler attended Yale School of Medicine and graduated in 1962. While at Yale, Tishler began working with the Thorndike Memorial Laboratory at Boston City Hospital from 1963 to 1977.

William B. Castle, discoverer of intrinsic factor, introduced him to Sidney H. Ingbar with whom Tishler began work on the metabolic actions of thyroid hormone. Maxwell Finland contributed to Tishler's scientific and clinical work. Tishler's interest in genetics arose from his laboratory research in the study of thyroid function in patients with phenylketonuria.

During the Vietnam War, Tishler worked as a Public Health Service officer at the National Institutes of Health. In the following years, he continued his basic laboratory work, but also was concerned with genetics and medicine in the terms of population and epidemiology. He was also involved in familial studies of hypertension at one of the first community health centers in the U.S., East Boston Neighborhood Health Center.

== Selected publications ==
- Larkin, E. K.; Elston, R. C.; Patel, S. R.; Tishler, P. V.; Palmer, L. J.; Jenny, N. S.; Redline, S. (Mar 2005). "Linkage of serum leptin levels in families with sleep apnea". Int J Obes (Lond). 29 (3): 260–7. doi:10.1038/sj.ijo.0802872. PMID 15611783.
- Palmer, Lyle J.; Buxbaum, Sarah G.; Larkin, Emma K.; Patel, Sanjay R.; Elston, Robert C.; Tishler, Peter V.; Redline, Susan (Jun 2004). "Whole genome scan for obstructive sleep apnea and obesity in African-American families". Am J Respir Crit Care Med. 169 (12): 1314–21. doi:10.1164/rccm.200304-493oc. PMID 15070816.
- Tishler, PV; Larkin, EK; Schluchter, MD; Redline, S (May 2003). "Incidence of sleep-disordered breathing in an urban adult population: the relative importance of risk factors in the development of sleep-disordered breathing". JAMA. 289 (17): 2230–7. doi:10.1001/jama.289.17.2230. PMID 12734134.
- Tishler, Peter V. (1999). "The effect of therapeutic drugs and other pharmacologic agents on activity of porphobilinogen deaminase, the enzyme that is deficient in intermittent acute porphyria". Life Sci. 65 (2): 207–1. doi:10.1016/s0024-3205(99)00237-4. PMID 10416826.
- Tishler, Peter V.; Henschel, Carroll E.; Ngo, Tu A.; Walters, Ellen E.; Worobec, Thomas G. (Nov 1998). "Fetal alcohol effects in alcoholic veteran patients". Alcohol Clin Exp Res. 22 (8): 1825–31. doi:10.1111/j.1530-0277.1998.tb03988.x. PMID 9835303.
- Stampfer, Meir J.; Malinow, M. R.; Willett, W. C.; Newcomer, L. M.; Upson, B.; Ullmann, D.; Tishler, P. V.; Hennekens, C. H. (Aug 1992). "A prospective study of plasma homocyst(e)ine and risk of myocardial infarction in US physicians". JAMA. 268 (7): 877–81. doi:10.1001/jama.1992.03490070059042. PMID 1640615.
- Tishler, P. V. (Summer 1992). ""The care of the patient": a living testimony to Francis Weld Peabody". Pharos Alpha Omega Alpha Honor Med Soc. 55 (3): 32–6. PMID 1409858.
- Tishler, P. V. (Oct 1990). "Thoughts as I watched the Peabody Building fall, March 31, 1990". N Engl J Med. 323 (15): 1074. doi:10.1056/nejm199010113231519. PMID 2215573.
- Tishler, Peter V. (Oct 1979). "Healthy female carriers of a gene for the Alport syndrome: importance for genetic counseling". Clin Genet. 16 (4): 291–4. doi:10.1111/j.1399-0004.1979.tb01002.x. PMID 519898. S2CID 127230.
- Tishler, P. V. (Sep 1975). "A family with coexistent von Recklinghausen's neurofibromatosis and von Hippel-Lindau's disease. Diseases possibly derived from a common gene". Neurology. 25 (9): 840–4. doi:10.1212/wnl.25.9.840. PMID 808759. S2CID 24780531.
- Tishler, P. V. (Feb 1969). "Phenylketonuria: therapeutic problems". Br Med J. 1 (5642): 510. doi:10.1136/bmj.1.5642.510. PMC 1982511. PMID 5764268.
- Tishler, PV (May 1963). "Effect of thyroxine administered in vitro and in vivo on the succinoxidase and malic dehydrogenase reactions of frog myocardium". Endocrinology. 72 (5): 673–6. doi:10.1210/endo-72-5-673. PMID 13985162.
