= Decoquinate =

Chemical compound

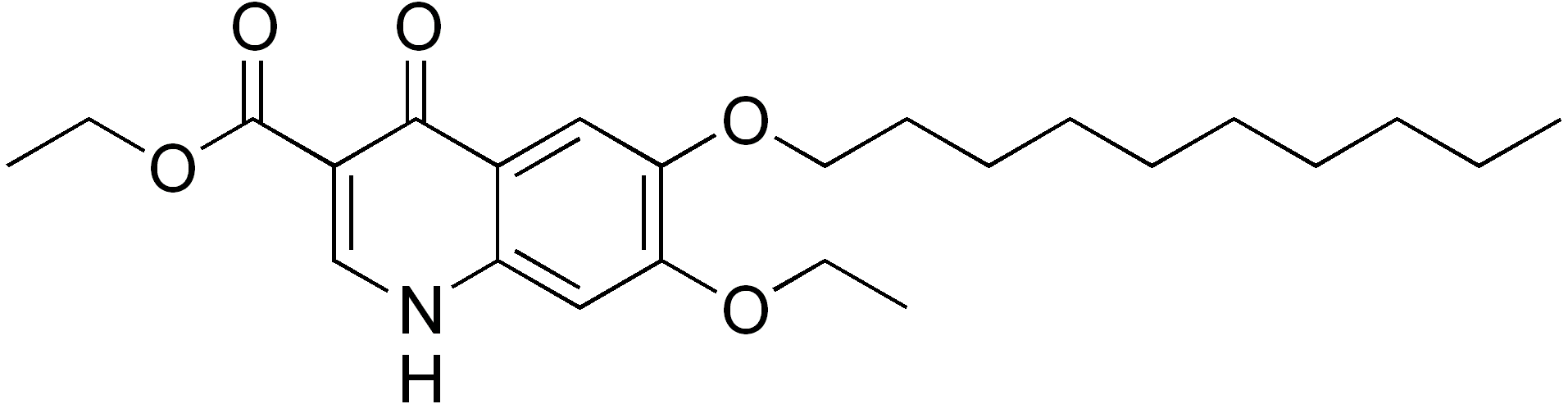

Clinical data
- AHFS/Drugs.com: International Drug Names
- ATCvet code: QP51BX04 (WHO)

Identifiers
- IUPAC name: 6-Decoxy-7-ethoxy-4-oxo-1H-quinoline-3-carboxylic acid ethyl ester
- CAS Number: 18507-89-6
- PubChem CID: 29112
- ChemSpider: 27081
- UNII: 534I52PVWH
- KEGG: D03667
- ChEMBL: ChEMBL416230
- CompTox Dashboard (EPA): DTXSID5046851
- ECHA InfoCard: 100.038.521

Chemical and physical data
- Formula: C_{24}H_{35}NO_{5}
- Molar mass: 417.546 g·mol^{−1}
- 3D model (JSmol): Interactive image
- SMILES: CCCCCCCCCCOC1=C(C=C2C(=C1)C(=O)C(=CN2)C(=O)OCC)OCC
- InChI: InChI=1S/C24H35NO5/c1-4-7-8-9-10-11-12-13-14-30-21-15-18-20(16-22(21)28-5-2)25-17-19(23(18)26)24(27)29-6-3/h15-17H,4-14H2,1-3H3,(H,25,26); Key:JHAYEQICABJSTP-UHFFFAOYSA-N

Decoquinate is a quinolone coccidiostat used in veterinary medicine.
