= Arsthinol =

- Structural formula of arsthinol

Names
- Preferred IUPAC name N-{2-Hydroxy-5-[4-(hydroxymethyl)-1,3,2-dithiarsolan-2-yl]phenyl}acetamide

Identifiers
CAS Number	119-96-0
3D model (JSmol)	Interactive image; Interactive image
ChEBI	CHEBI:135465
ChEMBL	ChEMBL1788384
ChemSpider	8107
DrugBank	DB08928
ECHA InfoCard	100.003.965
EC Number	204-361-7
KEGG	D07356
PubChem CID	8414
UNII	QNT09A162Y
CompTox Dashboard (EPA)	DTXSID40861753
- InChI: InChI=1S/C11H14AsNO3S2/c1-7(15)13-10-4-8(2-3-11(10)16)12-17-6-9(5-14)18-12/h2-4,9,14,16H,5-6H2,1H3,(H,13,15) Key: MRUDSZSRLQAPOG-UHFFFAOYSA-N; InChI=1/C11H14AsNO3S2/c1-7(15)13-10-4-8(2-3-11(10)16)12-17-6-9(5-14)18-12/h2-4,9,14,16H,5-6H2,1H3,(H,13,15) Key: MRUDSZSRLQAPOG-UHFFFAOYAP
- SMILES: CC(=O)NC1=C(O)C=CC(=C1)[As]1SCC(CO)S1; O=C(Nc2cc([As]1SCC(S1)CO)ccc2O)C

Properties
Chemical formula	C_{11}H_{14}AsNO_{3}S_{2}
Molar mass	347.28 g·mol^{−1}

Pharmacology
ATC code	P01AR01 (WHO) QP51AD01 (WHO)
Routes of administration	Oral
- Pharmacokinetics
Metabolism	89 % Hepatic
- Except where otherwise noted, data are given for materials in their standard state (at 25 °C [77 °F], 100 kPa). verify (what is ?) Infobox references

Arsthinol (INN) is an organoarsenic compound with the formula HOCH_{2}CHCH_{2}S_{2}AsC_{6}H_{3}(OH)NHCOCH_{3}. A antiprotozoal agent, it was first reported in 1949. It arises by the reaction of acetarsol with 2,3-dimercaptopropanol (British anti-Lewisite) and has been demonstrated to be effective against amoebiasis and yaws. It was marketed a few years later by Endo Products (Balarsen, Tablets, 0.1 g).

Among trivalent organoarsenicals, arsthinol was considered very well tolerated. Recently, it was studied for its anticancer activity.

== Properties ==
For Arsthinol the hydrogen bond donor count of 3, a hydrogen bond acceptor count of 5, a complexity of 308, and contains no isotope atoms. It is chiral but marketed as the racemate.
