= Robenidine =

Chemical compound

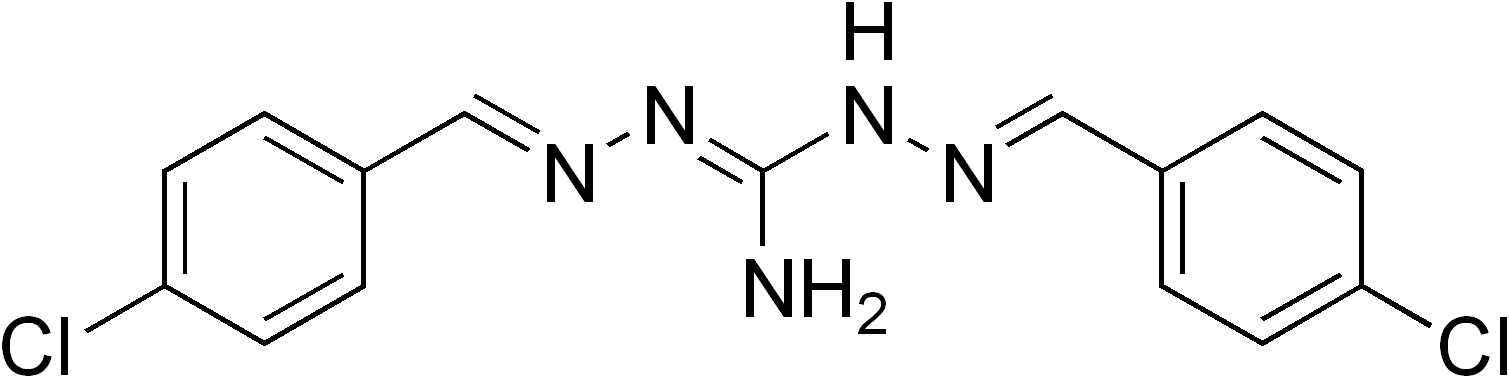

Clinical data
- AHFS/Drugs.com: International Drug Names
- ATCvet code: QP51BX03 (WHO)

Identifiers
- IUPAC name: 1,2-Bis[(4-chlorophenyl)methyleneamino]guanidine
- CAS Number: 25875-51-8
- PubChem CID: 9570438
- ChemSpider: 7844905
- UNII: 4888ME6C4E
- CompTox Dashboard (EPA): DTXSID9046813
- ECHA InfoCard: 100.042.993

Chemical and physical data
- Formula: C_{15}H_{13}Cl_{2}N_{5}
- Molar mass: 334.20 g·mol^{−1}
- 3D model (JSmol): Interactive image
- SMILES: C1=CC(=CC=C1C=NNC(=NN=CC2=CC=C(C=C2)Cl)N)Cl
- InChI: InChI=1S/C15H13Cl2N5/c16-13-5-1-11(2-6-13)9-19-21-15(18)22-20-10-12-3-7-14(17)8-4-12/h1-10H,(H3,18,21,22)/b19-9+,20-10+; Key:MOOFYEJFXBSZGE-LQGKIZFRSA-N

Robenidine is a coccidiostat. Robenidine is an antibiotic used for the control of coccidiosis, a debilitating protozoal infection in poultry. Although there are alternative antibiotics available, robenidine is important in the management of antibiotic resistance as farmers rotate the use of robenidine with other antibiotics to try to preserve the effectiveness of these products in fighting infections.
