= Acetarsol =

- Kekulé, skeletal formula of acetarsol

Names
- Preferred IUPAC name (3-Acetamido-4-hydroxyphenyl)arsonic acid
- Other names Acetarsone

Identifiers
CAS Number	97-44-9
3D model (JSmol)	Interactive image; Interactive image
ChEBI	CHEBI:135135
ChEMBL	ChEMBL1330792
ChemSpider	1908
DrugBank	DB13268
ECHA InfoCard	100.002.349
EC Number	202-582-3
KEGG	D07110
MeSH	Acetarsol
PubChem CID	1985
UNII	806529YU1N
UN number	3465
CompTox Dashboard (EPA)	DTXSID9045847
- InChI: InChI=1S/C8H10AsNO5/c1-5(11)10-7-4-6(9(13,14)15)2-3-8(7)12/h2-4,12H,1H3,(H,10,11)(H2,13,14,15) Key: ODFJOVXVLFUVNQ-UHFFFAOYSA-N; InChI=1/C8H10AsNO5/c1-5(11)10-7-4-6(9(13,14)15)2-3-8(7)12/h2-4,12H,1H3,(H,10,11)(H2,13,14,15) Key: ODFJOVXVLFUVNQ-UHFFFAOYAX
- SMILES: CC(=O)Nc1cc(ccc1O)[As](O)(O)=O; CC(=O)NC1=CC(=CC=C1O)[As](O)(O)=O

Properties
Chemical formula	C_{8}H_{10}AsNO_{5}
Molar mass	275.0903 g mol^{−1}

Pharmacology
ATC code	A07AX02 (WHO) G01AB01 (WHO), P01CD02 (WHO), P51AD05 (WHO)

Hazards
- GHS labelling
Pictograms	(GHS06: Toxic) (GHS09: Environmental hazard)
Signal word	Danger
Hazard statements	H301, H331, H410
Precautionary statements	P261, P273, P301+P310, P311, P501
- Except where otherwise noted, data are given for materials in their standard state (at 25 °C [77 °F], 100 kPa). verify (what is ?) Infobox references

Acetarsol (or acetarsone, also known as spirocid) is an anti-infective drug. It was first discovered in 1921 at Pasteur Institute by Ernest Fourneau, and sold under the brand name Stovarsol. It was available in oral form and also as a suppository. It has been cancelled and withdrawn from the market since August 12, 1997.

Acetarsol can be used to make arsthinol.

== Medical uses ==
Acetarsol has been used for the treatment of diseases such as syphilis, amoebiasis, yaws, trypanosomiasisiasis and malaria. Acetarsol was used for the treatment of Trichomonas Vaginalis and Candida Albicans. In the oral form, acetarsol can be used for the treatment of intestinal amoebiasis. As a suppository, acetarsol was researched to be used for the treatment of proctitis.

== Mechanism of action ==
Although the mechanism of action is not fully known, acetarsol may bind to protein-containing sulfhydryl groups located in the parasite, which then creates lethal As-S bonds, which then kills the parasite.

== Chemistry and pharmacokinetics ==
Acetarsol has the molecular formula N-acetyl-4-hydroxy-m-arsinillic acid, and it is a pentavalent arsenical compound with antiprotozoal and anthelmintic properties. The arsenic found in acetarsol is excreted mainly in urine. The level of arsenic after acetarsol administration reaches close to the toxic range in urine. Some reports indicate a remission of arsenic which can be physiologically dangerous.

== Toxicity ==
Some reports indicate that acetarsol can produce effects in the eyes such as optic neuritis and optic atrophy.
