= Clopidol =

Chemical compound

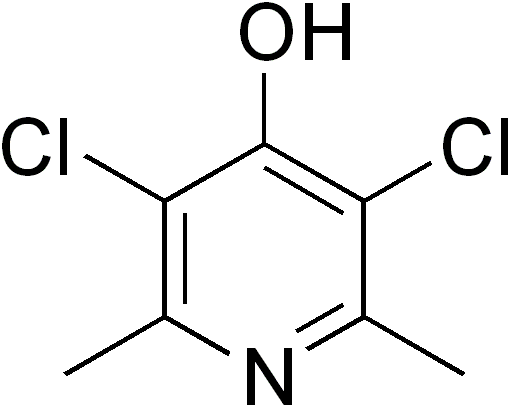

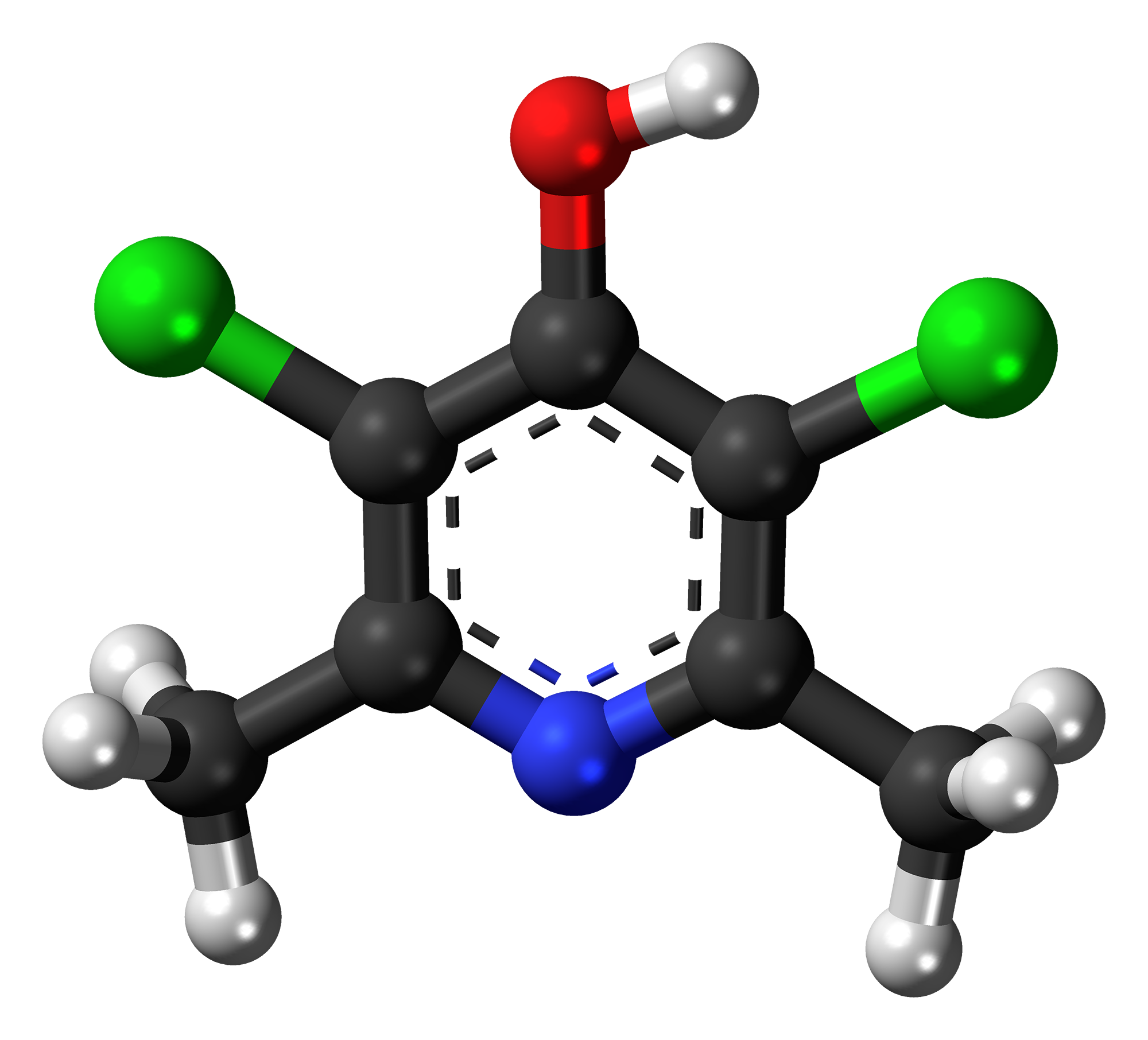

Clinical data
- Trade names: Coyden, Clobek(Animate Animal Health)
- AHFS/Drugs.com: International Drug Names
- ATCvet code: QP51BX05 (WHO)

Identifiers
- IUPAC name: 3,5-Dichloro-2,6-dimethyl-pyridin-4-ol
- CAS Number: 2971-90-6
- PubChem CID: 18087
- ChemSpider: 17084
- UNII: 8J763HFF5N
- KEGG: D03559
- ChEMBL: ChEMBL446918
- CompTox Dashboard (EPA): DTXSID8041793
- ECHA InfoCard: 100.019.099

Chemical and physical data
- Formula: C_{7}H_{7}Cl_{2}NO
- Molar mass: 192.04 g·mol^{−1}
- 3D model (JSmol): Interactive image
- SMILES: CC1=C(Cl)C(O)=C(Cl)C(C)=N1
- InChI: InChI=1S/C7H7Cl2NO/c1-3-5(8)7(11)6(9)4(2)10-3/h1-2H3,(H,10,11); Key:ZDPIZLCVJAAHHR-UHFFFAOYSA-N

Clopidol is an organic compound that is used as in veterinary medicine as a coccidiostat. It is prepared industrially by a multistep process from dehydroacetic acid.

The US National Institute for Occupational Safety and Health has set a recommended exposure limit (REL) for clopidol at 10 mg/m^{3} TWA (time-weighted average) for total exposure, 5 mg/m^{3} TWA for respiratory exposure, and 20 mg/m^{3} for short-term exposure. The Occupational Safety and Health Administration has set a permissible exposure limit (PEL); the respiratory PEL is the same as the REL, but the total exposure limit is 15 mg/m^{3}.
