= Azanidazole =

Chemical compound

Clinical data
- AHFS/Drugs.com: International Drug Names
- ATC code: G01AF13 (WHO) P01AB04 (WHO) QP51AA04 (WHO)

Identifiers
- IUPAC name: 4-[(E)-2-(1-methyl-5-nitro-1H-imidazol- 2-yl)ethenyl]pyrimidin-2-amine
- CAS Number: 62973-76-6
- PubChem CID: 6436171
- ChemSpider: 4940835
- UNII: YP2Y0DRX4S
- KEGG: D03028
- ChEMBL: ChEMBL134920
- CompTox Dashboard (EPA): DTXSID40212180

Chemical and physical data
- Formula: C_{10}H_{10}N_{6}O_{2}
- Molar mass: 246.230 g·mol^{−1}
- 3D model (JSmol): Interactive image
- SMILES: [O-][N+](=O)c2cnc(\C=C\c1nc(ncc1)N)n2C
- InChI: InChI=1S/C10H10N6O2/c1-15-8(13-6-9(15)16(17)18)3-2-7-4-5-12-10(11)14-7/h2-6H,1H3,(H2,11,12,14)/b3-2+; Key:LHIALLMPKJMSIQ-NSCUHMNNSA-N

Azanidazole is a nitroimidazole derivative used in gynecology for the treatment of trichomonal infections.
