= Ethopabate =

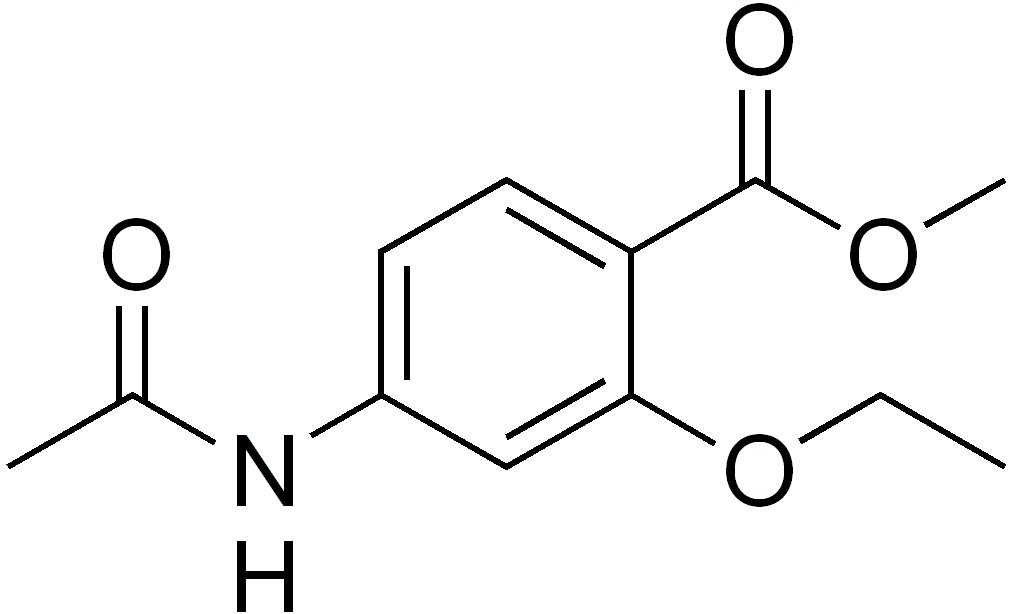

Names
- Preferred IUPAC name Methyl 4-acetamido-2-ethoxybenzoate

Identifiers
CAS Number	59-06-3
3D model (JSmol)	Interactive image; Interactive image
ChEMBL	ChEMBL458769
ChemSpider	5812
ECHA InfoCard	100.000.377
KEGG	D08916
PubChem CID	6034
UNII	F4X3L6068O
CompTox Dashboard (EPA)	DTXSID6046264
- InChI: InChI=1S/C12H15NO4/c1-4-17-11-7-9(13-8(2)14)5-6-10(11)12(15)16-3/h5-7H,4H2,1-3H3,(H,13,14) Ethopabate is almost odorless white to pale reddish white powder. It is freely soluble in chloroform, soluble in methanol or ethanol, very slightly soluble in ether, and practically insoluble in water. Ethopabate is designated as a feed additive to promote the effective use of nutrient components contained in feeds, and the ordinance of MAFF allows the use of it in the range of 2.56-16 g/t in feeds for starting chicks, growing chicks, prior stage or later stage broiler chickens (up to 7 days before killing for edible use). Further, use of ethopabate at a concentration of 5 g/t is approved for three-combination with amprolium and sulfaquinoxaline in formula feeds for chickens. Key: GOVWOKSKFSBNGD-UHFFFAOYSA-N; InChI=1/C12H15NO4/c1-4-17-11-7-9(13-8(2)14)5-6-10(11)12(15)16-3/h5-7H,4H2,1-3H3,(H,13,14) Key: GOVWOKSKFSBNGD-UHFFFAOYAO
- SMILES: CCOC1=C(C=CC(=C1)NC(=O)C)C(=O)OC; O=C(Nc1cc(OCC)c(cc1)C(=O)OC)C

Properties
Chemical formula	C_{12}H_{15}NO_{4}
Molar mass	237.25 g/mol

Pharmacology
ATCvet code	QP51AX17 (WHO)
- Except where otherwise noted, data are given for materials in their standard state (at 25 °C [77 °F], 100 kPa). verify (what is ?) Infobox references

Ethopabate is a coccidiostat used in poultry.
