= Phenamidine =

Chemical compound

Clinical data
- Trade names: Oxopirvedine
- Other names: 4,4'-Diamidinodiphenyl ether; 4,4'-Oxydibenzamidine
- ATCvet code: QP51AF03 (WHO)

Identifiers
- IUPAC name: 4,4’-Oxydibenzenecarboximidamide
- CAS Number: 101-62-2
- PubChem CID: 64948
- ChemSpider: 58474
- UNII: 382086V7IB
- CompTox Dashboard (EPA): DTXSID10143619
- ECHA InfoCard: 100.002.692

Chemical and physical data
- Formula: C_{14}H_{14}N_{4}O
- Molar mass: 254.293 g·mol^{−1}
- 3D model (JSmol): Interactive image
- Melting point: 215 to 216 °C (419 to 421 °F)
- SMILES: O(c1ccc(C(=[N@H])N)cc1)c2ccc(cc2)C(=[N@H])N
- InChI: InChI=1S/C14H14N4O/c15-13(16)9-1-5-11(6-2-9)19-12-7-3-10(4-8-12)14(17)18/h1-8H,(H3,15,16)(H3,17,18); Key:DMABBVCVVXMJDH-UHFFFAOYSA-N

Phenamidine is an antiprotozoal drug of the amidine class used in veterinary medicine. It is used to treat Babesia infection (babesiosis) dogs, horses, and cattle. Because the drug causes frequent allergic reactions, it is usually combined with an antihistamine.
