= Sulfadimidine =

Chemical compound

Sulfamethazine

Clinical data
- AHFS/Drugs.com: International Drug Names
- ATC code: J01EB03 (WHO) QJ01EQ03 (WHO) QP51AG01 (WHO) QP51AG51 (WHO)

Identifiers
- IUPAC name: 4-amino-N-(4,6-dimethylpyrimidin-2-yl) benzene-1-sulfonamide
- CAS Number: 57-68-1
- PubChem CID: 5327
- DrugBank: DB01582
- ChemSpider: 5136
- UNII: 48U51W007F
- KEGG: D02436
- ChEBI: CHEBI:102265
- ChEMBL: ChEMBL446
- NIAID ChemDB: 027749
- CompTox Dashboard (EPA): DTXSID6021290
- ECHA InfoCard: 100.000.315

Chemical and physical data
- Formula: C_{12}H_{14}N_{4}O_{2}S
- Molar mass: 278.33 g·mol^{−1}
- 3D model (JSmol): Interactive image
- Melting point: 176 °C (349 °F)
- SMILES: O=S(=O)(Nc1nc(cc(n1)C)C)c2ccc(N)cc2
- InChI: InChI=1S/C12H14N4O2S/c1-8-7-9(2)15-12(14-8)16-19(17,18)11-5-3-10(13)4-6-11/h3-7H,13H2,1-2H3,(H,14,15,16); Key:ASWVTGNCAZCNNR-UHFFFAOYSA-N

Sulfadimidine or sulfamethazine is a sulfonamide antibacterial.

There are non-standardized^{a} abbreviations for it as "sulfadimidine" (abbreviated SDI and more commonly but less reliably^{b} SDD) and as "sulfamethazine" (abbreviated SMT and more commonly but less reliably^{c} SMZ). Other names include sulfadimerazine, sulfadimezine, and sulphadimethylpyrimidine.
