= Dinitolmide =

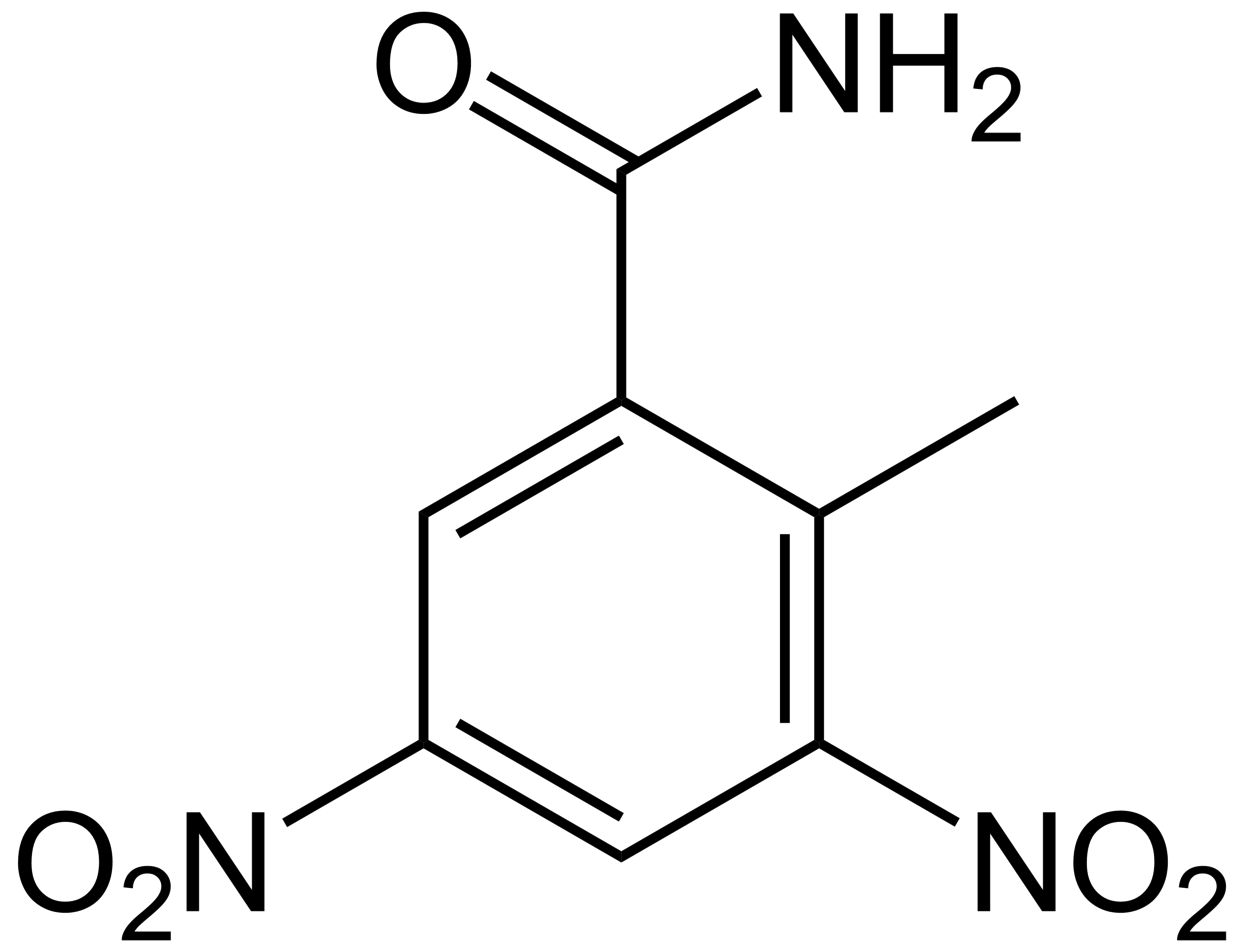

Names
- Preferred IUPAC name 2-Methyl-3,5-dinitrobenzamide
- Other names 3,5-Dinitro-o-toluamide; Zoalene

Identifiers
| CAS Number | 148-01-6 |
| 3D model (JSmol) | Interactive image |
| ChEMBL | ChEMBL472565 |
| ChemSpider | 2982 |
| ECHA InfoCard | 100.005.189 |
| PubChem CID | 3092 |
| UNII | AOX68RY4TV |
| CompTox Dashboard (EPA) | DTXSID6042521 |
- InChI: InChI=1S/C8H7N3O5/c1-4-6(8(9)12)2-5(10(13)14)3-7(4)11(15)16/h2-3H,1H3,(H2,9,12) Key: ZEFNOZRLAWVAQF-UHFFFAOYSA-N; InChI=1/C8H7N3O5/c1-4-6(8(9)12)2-5(10(13)14)3-7(4)11(15)16/h2-3H,1H3,(H2,9,12) Key: ZEFNOZRLAWVAQF-UHFFFAOYAL
- SMILES: O=[N+]([O-])c1cc(cc(C(=O)N)c1C)[N+]([O-])=O

Properties
| Chemical formula | C_{8}H_{7}N_{3}O_{5} |
| Molar mass | 225.16 g/mol |
| Melting point | 177 °C; 351 °F; 450 K |

Pharmacology
| ATCvet code | QP51AX12 (WHO) |

Hazards
| Flash point | noncombustible |
- NIOSH (US health exposure limits)
| PEL (Permissible) | none |
| REL (Recommended) | TWA 5 mg/m^{3} |
| IDLH (Immediate danger) | N.D. |

Related compounds
| Related compounds | 3,5-Dinitrobenzoic acid o-Toluic acid Trinitrotoluene; 2,4-Dinitrotoluene |
- Except where otherwise noted, data are given for materials in their standard state (at 25 °C [77 °F], 100 kPa). verify (what is ?) Infobox references

Dinitolmide (or zoalene) is a fodder additive for poultry, used to prevent coccidiosis infections. It is sold under trade names such as Coccidine A, Coccidot, and Zoamix.

Dinitolmide is usually added to feed in doses of 125 ppm (preventive) or 250 ppm (curative). It is a broad-spectrum anticoccidial drug, preventing seven main strains of Eimeria coccidium. It leaves no residues in tissues. It can be also used to prevent coccidiosis of domestic rabbits.
