= Nimorazole =

Chemical compound

Clinical data
- AHFS/Drugs.com: International Drug Names
- ATC code: P01AB06 (WHO) QP51AA06 (WHO)

Identifiers
- IUPAC name: 4-[2-(5-nitro-1H-imidazol-1-yl)ethyl]morpholine
- CAS Number: 6506-37-2
- PubChem CID: 23009
- ChemSpider: 21533
- UNII: 469ULX0H4G
- KEGG: D07352
- CompTox Dashboard (EPA): DTXSID1057795
- ECHA InfoCard: 100.026.723

Chemical and physical data
- Formula: C_{9}H_{14}N_{4}O_{3}
- Molar mass: 226.236 g·mol^{−1}
- 3D model (JSmol): Interactive image
- SMILES: C1COCCN1CCN2C=NC=C2[N+](=O)[O-]
- InChI: InChI=1S/C9H14N4O3/c14-13(15)9-7-10-8-12(9)2-1-11-3-5-16-6-4-11/h7-8H,1-6H2; Key:MDJFHRLTPRPZLY-UHFFFAOYSA-N

Nimorazole (INN) is a nitroimidazole anti-infective. It is also being investigated for the treatment of head and neck cancer.
