= Sulfaquinoxaline =

Names
- Preferred IUPAC name 4-Amino-N-(quinoxalin-2-yl)benzene-1-sulfonamide
- Other names 4-Amino-N-2-quinoxalinylbenzenesulfonamide

Identifiers
CAS Number	59-40-5
3D model (JSmol)	Interactive image
ChEBI	CHEBI:94719
ChEMBL	ChEMBL1437847
ChemSpider	5147
DrugBank	DB11464
ECHA InfoCard	100.000.385
EC Number	200-423-2
KEGG	D05952
PubChem CID	5338
UNII	WNW8115TM9
CompTox Dashboard (EPA)	DTXSID8042424
- InChI: InChI=1S/C14H12N4O2S/c15-10-5-7-11(8-6-10)21(19,20)18-14-9-16-12-3-1-2-4-13(12)17-14/h1-9H,15H2,(H,17,18) Key: NHZLNPMOSADWGC-UHFFFAOYSA-N
- SMILES: C1=CC=C2C(=C1)N=CC(=N2)NS(=O)(=O)C3=CC=C(C=C3)N

Properties
Chemical formula	C_{14}H_{12}N_{4}O_{2}S
Molar mass	300.366 g/mol
Melting point	247.5 °C (477.5 °F; 520.6 K)
Solubility in water	slightly soluble in water
Solubility	slightly soluble in ethanol, acetone, soluble in aqueous alkaline solutions

Pharmacology
ATCvet code	QP51BA02 (WHO) QJ01EQ16 (WHO) QJ01EW16 (WHO) QP51AG53 (WHO)

Hazards
- GHS labelling
Pictograms	(GHS07: Exclamation mark) (GHS08: Health hazard)
Signal word	Danger
Hazard statements	H302, H317, H334
Precautionary statements	P261, P264, P270, P272, P280, P285, P301+P312, P302+P352, P304+P341, P321, P330, P333+P313, P342+P311, P363, P501
- Except where otherwise noted, data are given for materials in their standard state (at 25 °C [77 °F], 100 kPa). verify (what is ?) Infobox references

Sulfaquinoxaline (IUPAC name: 4-Amino-N-2-quinoxalinylbenzenesulfonamide) is a veterinary medicine which can be given to cattle and sheep to treat coccidiosis.
