= Nitroimidazole =

5-Nitroimidazole

Names
- Preferred IUPAC name 5-Nitro-1H-imidazole

Identifiers
CAS Number	3034-38-6
3D model (JSmol)	Interactive image
ChemSpider	10637918
ECHA InfoCard	100.019.296
EC Number	221-224-7
PubChem CID	18208
UNII	Y8U32AZ5O7
CompTox Dashboard (EPA)	DTXSID9062803
- InChI: InChI=1S/C3H3N3O2/c7-6(8)5-2-1-4-3-5/h1-3H Key: KUNMIWQQOPACSS-UHFFFAOYSA-N
- SMILES: c1cn(cn1)[N+](=O)[O-]

Properties
Chemical formula	C_{3}H_{3}N_{3}O_{2}
Molar mass	113.076 g·mol^{−1}
Melting point	303 °C (577 °F; 576 K) (decomposes)

Hazards
- GHS labelling
Pictograms	(GHS07: Exclamation mark)
Signal word	Warning
Hazard statements	H302
Precautionary statements	P261, P264, P270, P271, P280, P301+P312, P302+P352, P304+P312, P304+P340, P305+P351+P338, P312, P321, P322, P330, P332+P313, P337+P313, P362, P363, P403+P233, P405, P501
- Except where otherwise noted, data are given for materials in their standard state (at 25 °C [77 °F], 100 kPa). verify (what is ?) Infobox references

Nitroimidazoles are the group of organic compounds consisting of an imidazole ring with at least one nitro group substituent. The term also refers to the class of antibiotics that have nitroimidazole in their structures. These antibiotics commonly include the 5-nitroimidazole positional isomer.

== Synthesis ==

Imidazole undergoes a nitration reaction with a mixture of nitric acid and sulfuric acid to give 5-nitroimidazole.

== Nitroimidazole antibiotics ==
Position numbers on the ring

From the chemistry perspective, nitroimidazole antibiotics can be classified according to the location of the nitro functional group. Structures with names 4- and 5-nitroimidazole are equivalent from the perspective of drugs since these tautomers readily interconvert. Drugs of the 5-nitro variety include metronidazole, tinidazole, nimorazole, dimetridazole, pretomanid, ornidazole, megazol, and azanidazole. Drugs based on 2-nitroimidazoles include benznidazole and azomycin.

Nitroimidazole antibiotics have been used to combat anaerobic bacterial and parasitic infections. Perhaps the most common example is metronidazole. Other heterocycles such as nitrothiazoles (thiazole) are also used for this purpose. Nitroheterocycles are thought to be reductively activated in hypoxic cells, and then undergo chemical decomposition to form toxic radical products.

Three nitroimidazole antibiotics: metronidazole, tinidazole, and nimorazole
