= C8H6N2 =

The molecular formula C_{8}H_{6}N_{2} (molar mass: 130.15 g/mol) may refer to:

- Cinnoline
- Diazanaphthalenes
- 1,8-Naphthyridine
- Phthalazine, also called benzo-orthodiazine or benzopyridazine
- Quinazoline
- Quinoxaline
