= Simple aromatic ring =

Aromatic organic compounds consisting only of a conjugated planar ring system

Simple aromatic rings, also known as simple arenes or simple aromatics, are aromatic organic compounds that consist only of a conjugated planar ring system. Many simple aromatic rings have trivial names. They are usually found as substructures of more complex molecules ("substituted aromatics"). Typical simple aromatic compounds are benzene, indole, and pyridine.

Simple aromatic rings can be heterocyclic if they contain non-carbon ring atoms, for example, oxygen, nitrogen, or sulfur. They can be monocyclic as in benzene, bicyclic as in naphthalene, or polycyclic as in anthracene. Simple monocyclic aromatic rings are usually five-membered rings like pyrrole or six-membered rings like pyridine. Fused bicyclic molecules consist of two rings that are connected by shared edges.

== Heterocyclic aromatic rings ==
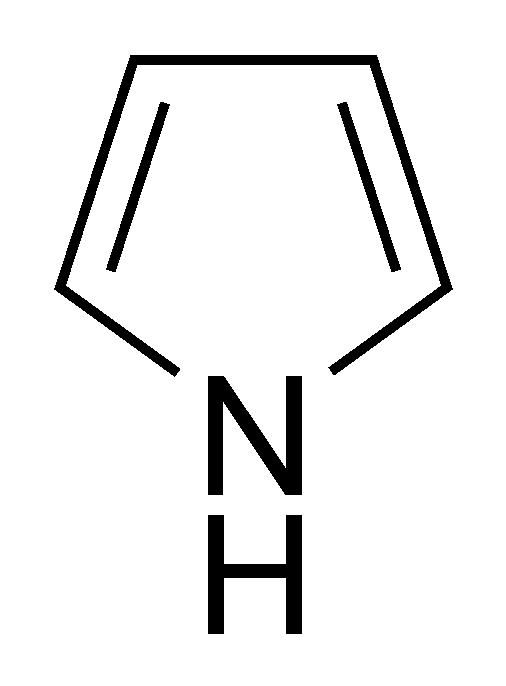
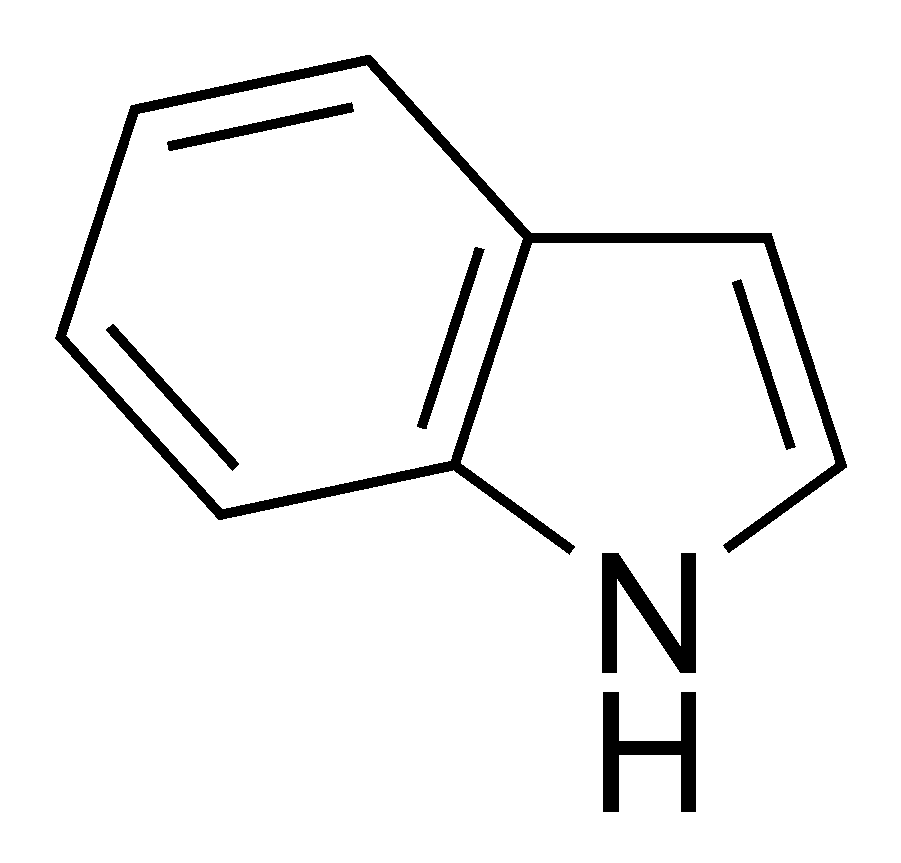
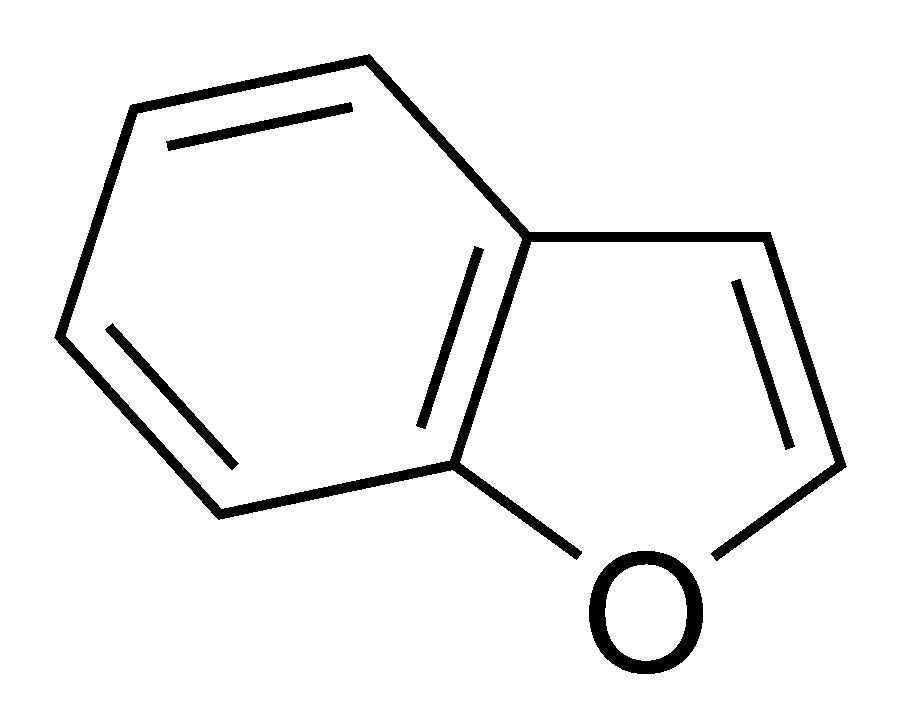
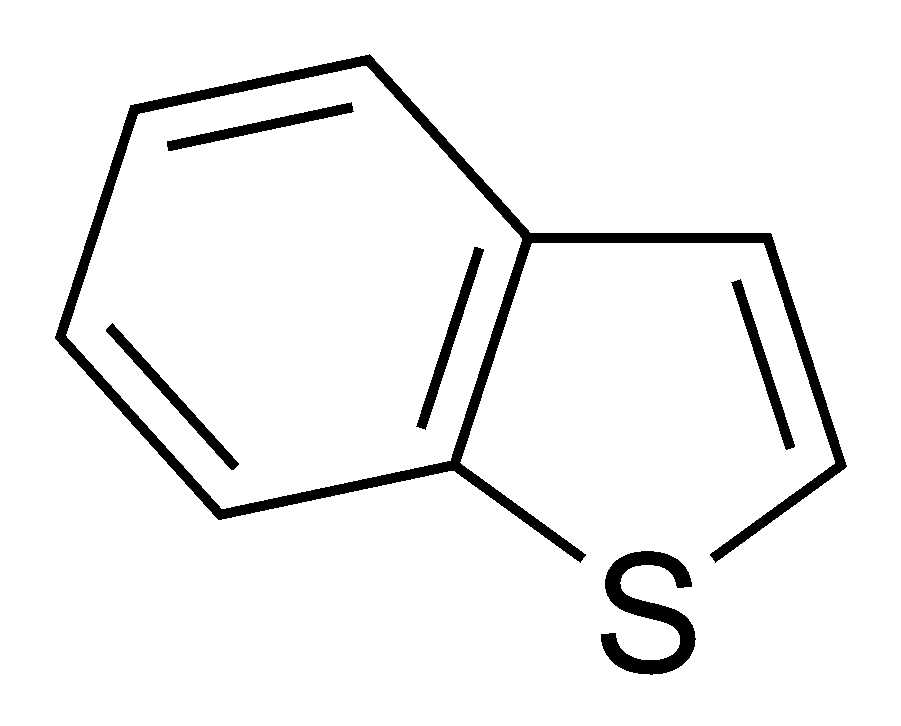
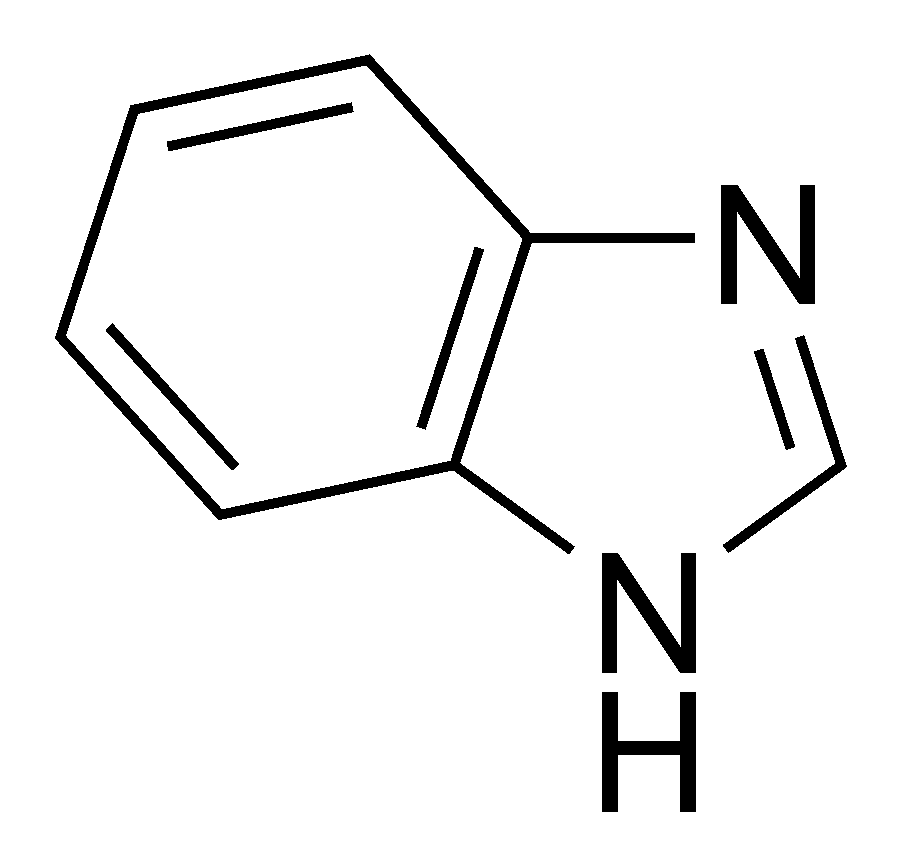
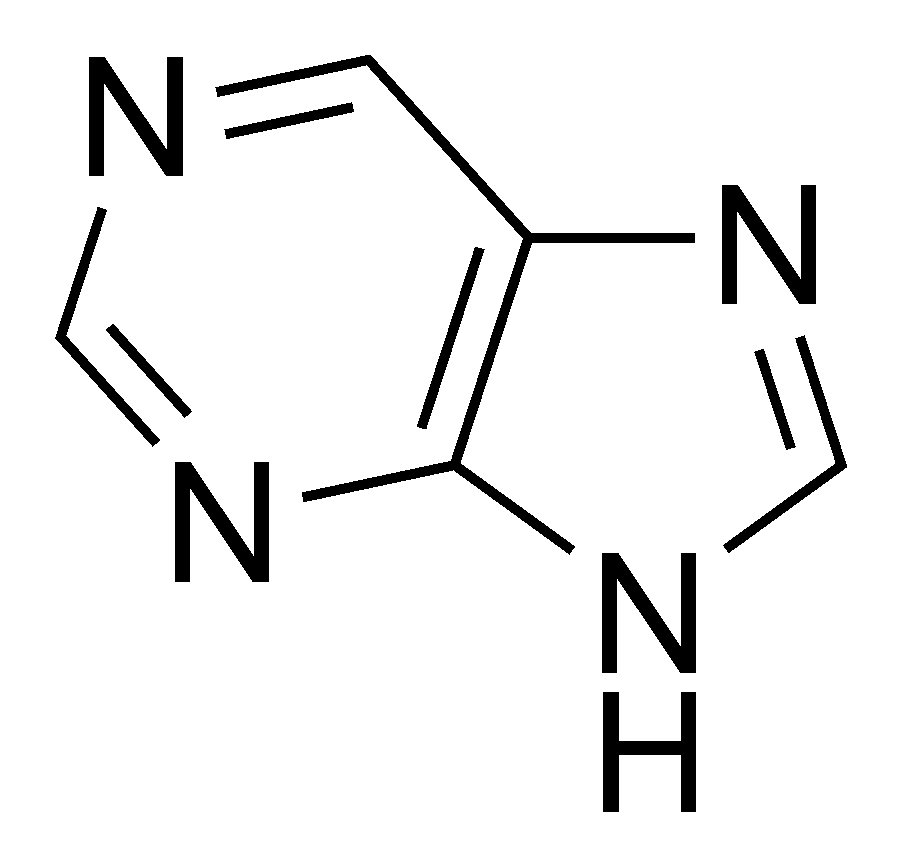
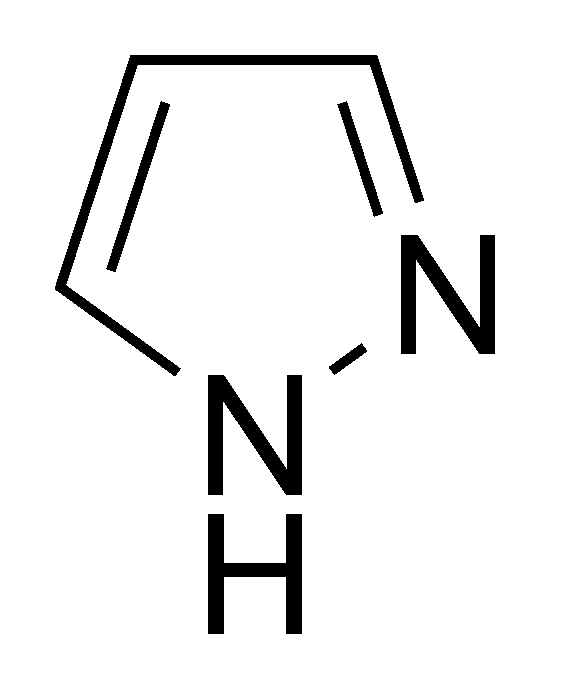
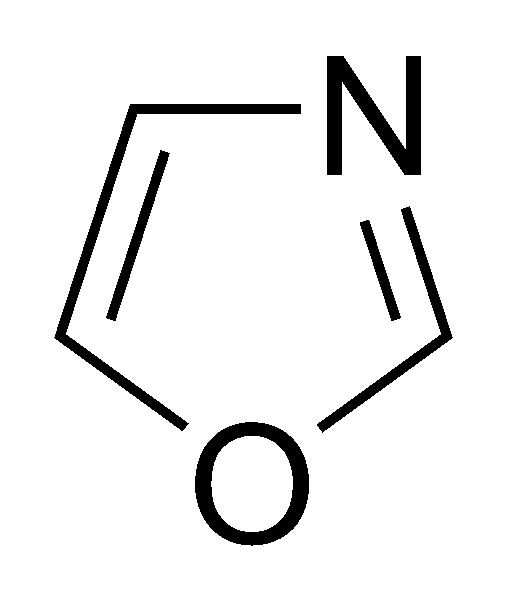
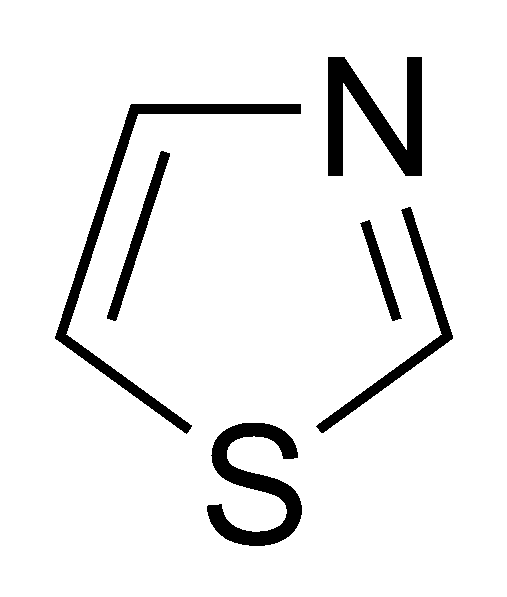
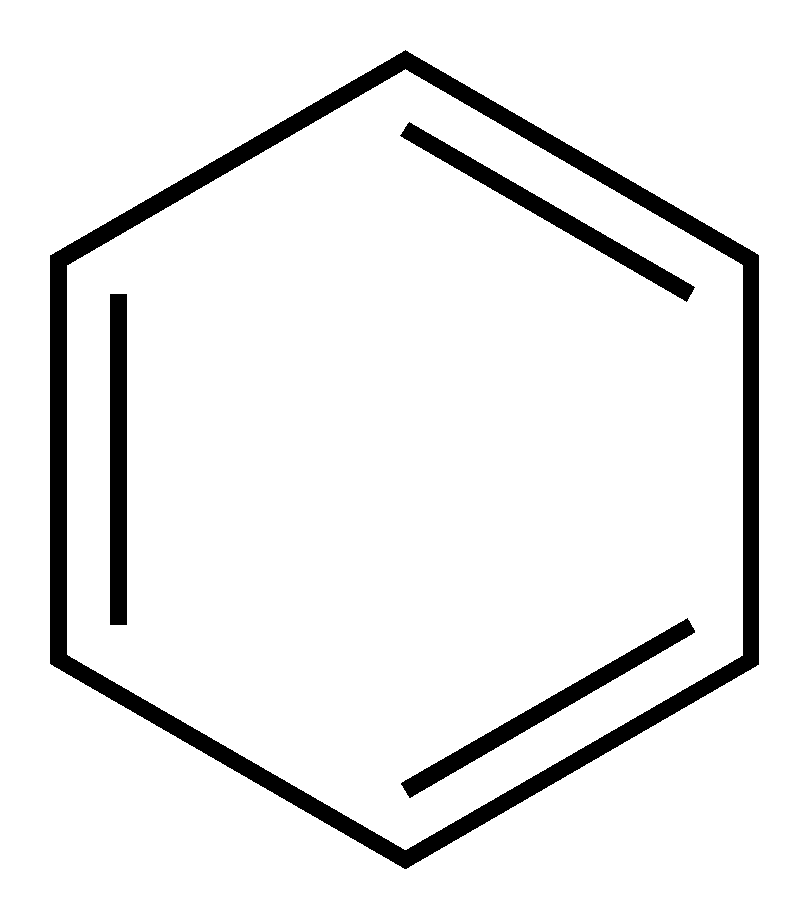
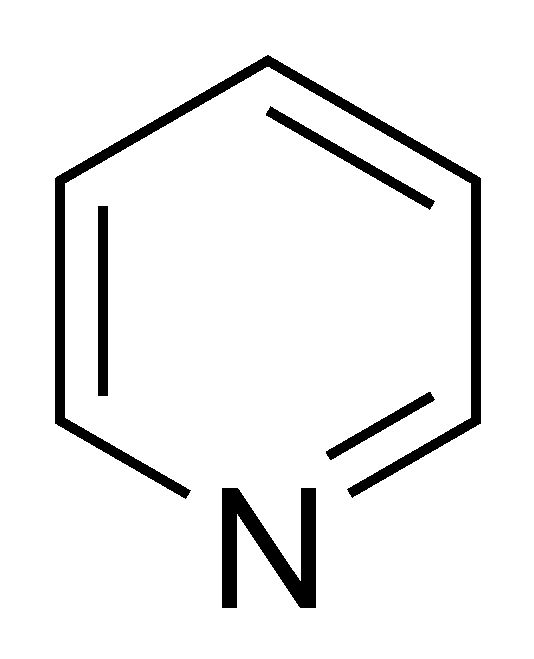
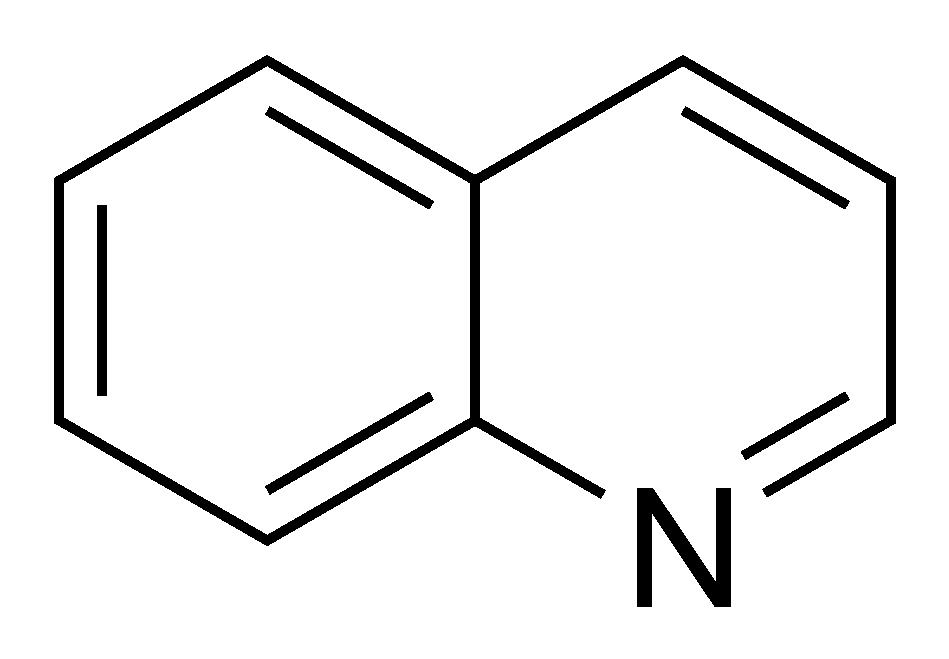
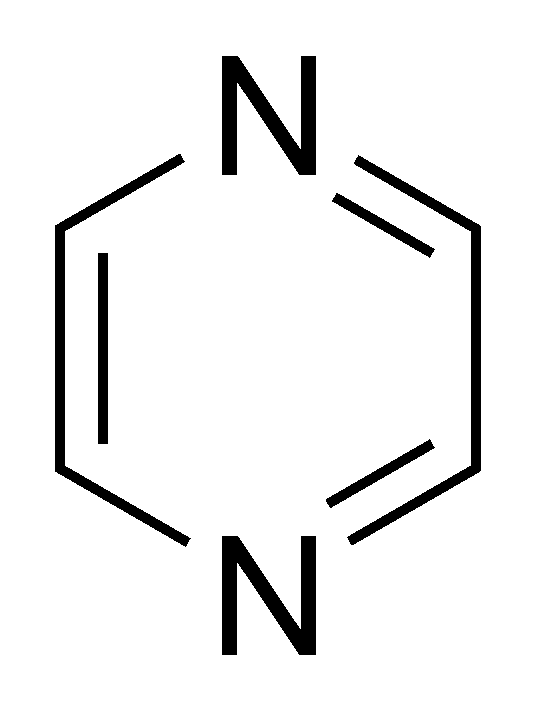
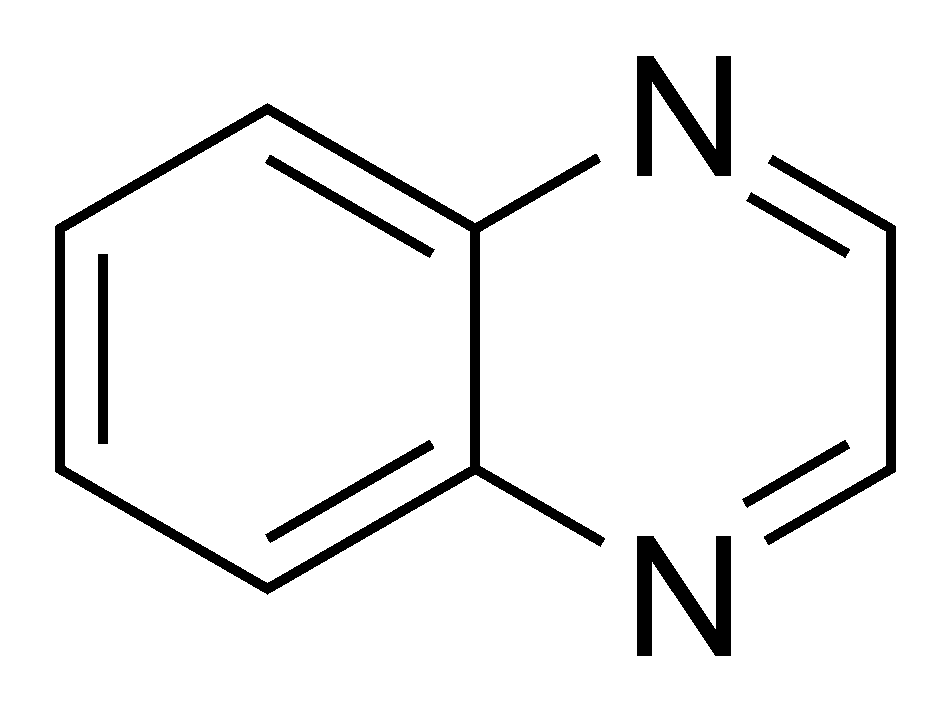
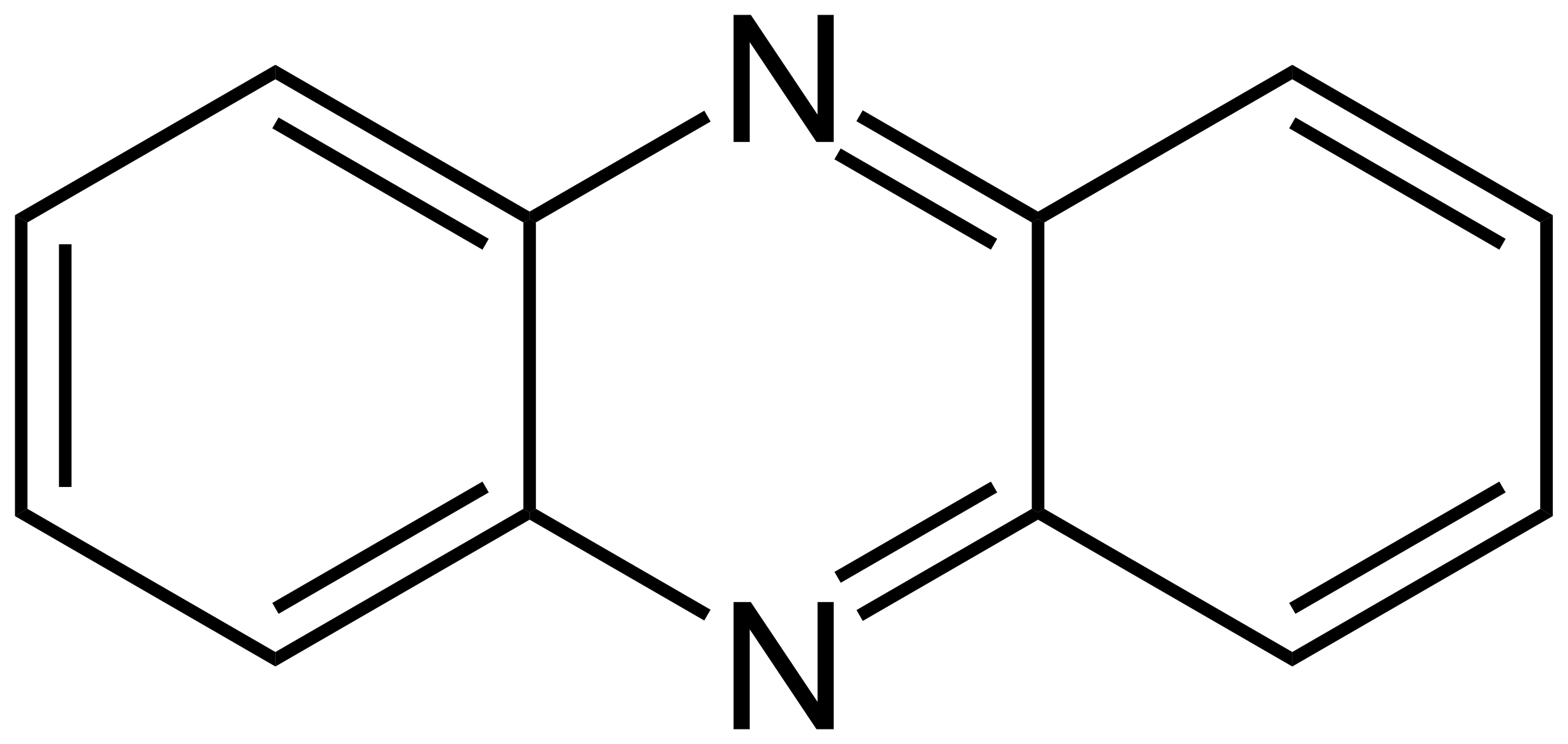
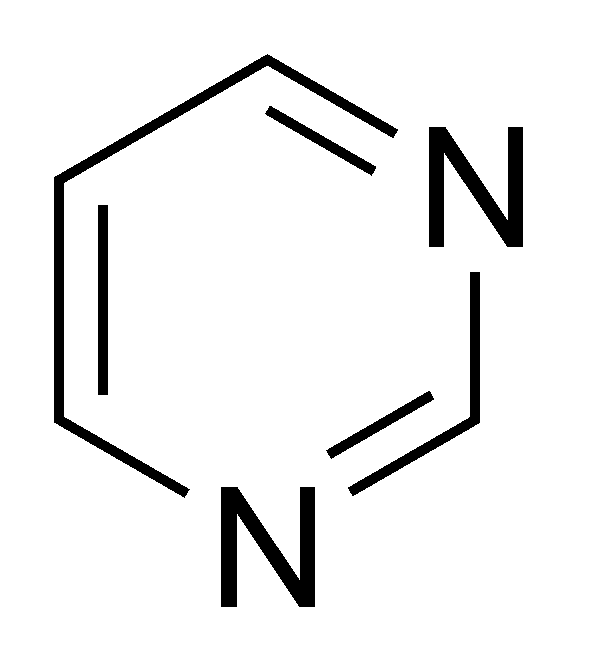
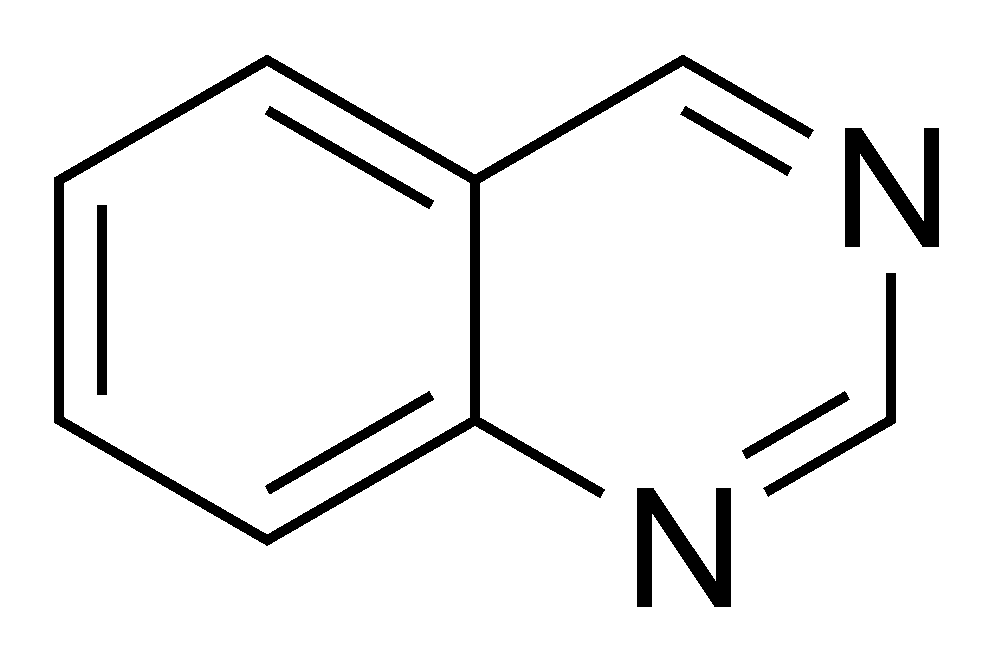
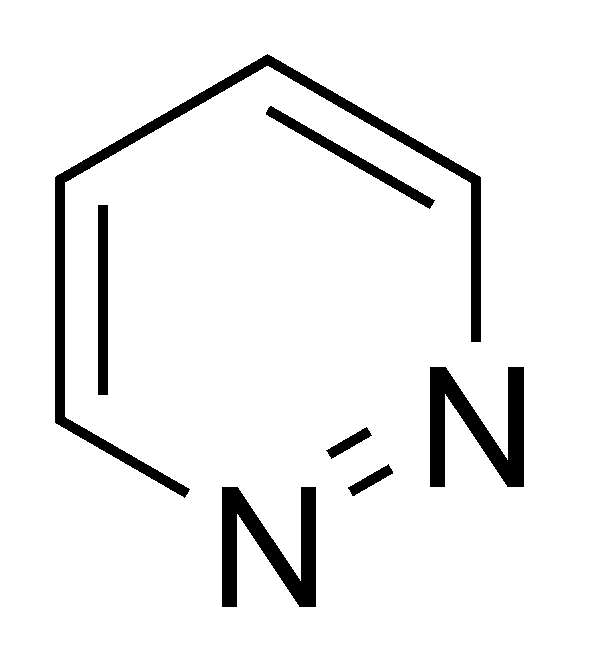
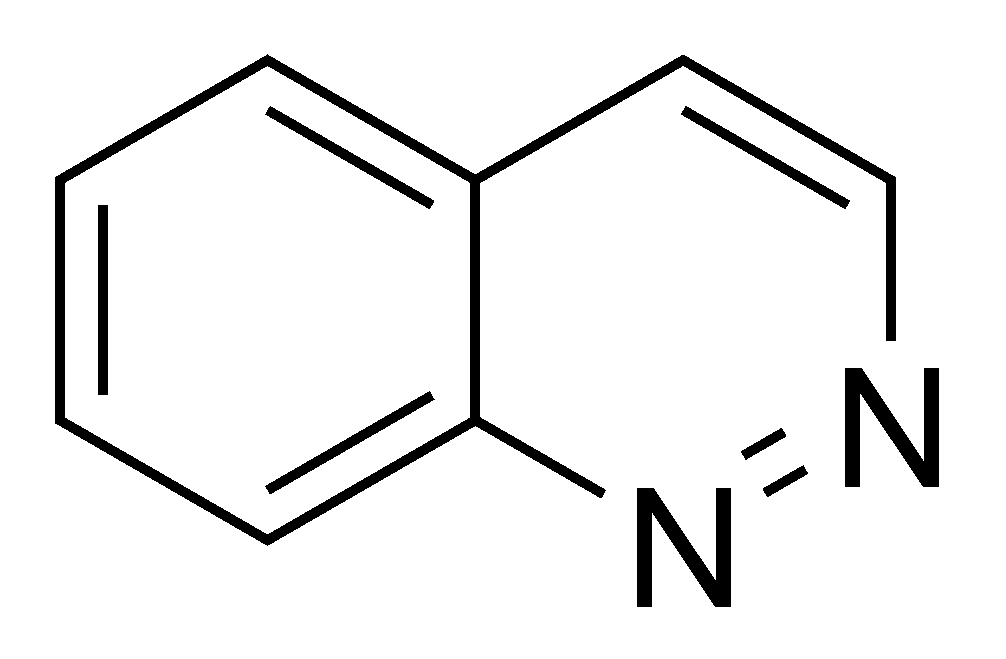
Table of simple aromatic rings
Five-membered rings	Fused five-membered rings with six-membered rings
Pyrrole	Indole	Carbazole
Furan	Benzofuran	Dibenzofuran
Thiophene	Benzothiophene	Dibenzothiophene
Imidazole	Benzimidazole	Purine
Pyrazole	Indazole
Oxazole	Benzoxazole
Thiazole	Benzothiazole
1,2,3-Triazole	1,2,4-Triazole
Six-membered rings	Fused six-membered rings with six-membered rings
Benzene	Naphthalene	Anthracene
Pyridine	Quinoline	Acridine
Pyrazine	Quinoxaline	Phenazine
Pyrimidine	Quinazoline	Pteridine
Pyridazine	Cinnoline	Phthalazine
1,2,3-Triazine	1,2,4-Triazine	1,3,5-Triazine

The nitrogen (N)-containing aromatic rings can be separated into basic aromatic rings that are easily protonated, and form aromatic cations and salts (e.g., pyridinium), and non-basic aromatic rings.

- In the basic aromatic rings, the lone pair of electrons is not part of the aromatic system and extends in the plane of the ring. This lone pair is responsible for the basicity of these nitrogenous bases, similar to the nitrogen atom in amines. In these compounds, the nitrogen atom is not connected to a hydrogen atom. Examples of basic aromatic rings are pyridine or quinoline. Several rings contain basic as well as non-basic nitrogen atoms, e.g., imidazole and purine.
- In the non-basic rings, the lone pair of electrons of the nitrogen atom is delocalized and contributes to the aromatic pi-electron system. In these compounds, the nitrogen atom is connected to a hydrogen atom. Examples of non-basic nitrogen-containing aromatic rings are pyrrole and indole.

In the oxygen- and sulfur-containing aromatic rings, one of the electron pairs of the heteroatoms contributes to the aromatic system (similar to the non-basic nitrogen-containing rings), whereas the second lone pair extends in the plane of the ring (similar to the primary nitrogen-containing rings).

== Criteria for aromaticity ==
- The molecule must be cyclic.
- Every atom in the ring must have an occupied p orbital, which overlaps with p orbitals on either side (completely conjugated).
- The molecule must be planar.
- It must contain an odd number of pairs of pi electrons; must satisfy Hückel's rule: (4n+2) pi electrons, where n is an integer starting at zero.

In contrast, molecules with 4n pi electrons are antiaromatic.

== See also ==
- Aromatic compound
- Polycyclic aromatic hydrocarbon (PAH)
