= Basic aromatic ring =

Basic aromatic ring systems
Pyridine	Quinoline	Acridine
Pyrazine	Quinoxaline	Phenazine
Imidazole	Benzimidazole	Purine
Pyrimidine	Quinazoline	Pteridine
Pyrazole	Indazole	
Pyridazine	Cinnoline	

Basic aromatic rings are heterocyclic aromatic compounds in which the lone pair of electrons of a ring-nitrogen atom is not part of the aromatic system, but instead extends in the plane of the ring. This lone pair is responsible for the basicity of these nitrogenous bases, similar to the nitrogen atom in amines. In these compounds the nitrogen atom is not connected to a hydrogen atom. Basic aromatic compounds get protonated and form aromatic cations (e.g. pyridinium) under acidic conditions. Typical examples of basic aromatic rings are pyridine or quinoline. Several rings contain basic as well as non-basic nitrogen atoms, e.g. imidazole and purine.

In non-basic aromatic rings, the lone-pair electrons of the nitrogen atom is delocalized and contributes to the aromatic pi electron system and is therefore not available to react with acids or other electrophilic atoms. Examples of non-basic nitrogen-containing aromatic rings are pyrrole and indole. Pyrrole contains a lone pair that is part of the pi-conjugated system, so it is not available to deprotonate an acidic proton.

The basic aromatic rings purines and pyrimidines are nucleobases found in DNA and RNA.

== See also ==
- Simple aromatic ring
