= (2E,6E)-farnesyl-diphosphate:isopentenyl-diphosphate farnesyltranstransferase =

(2E,6E)-farnesyl-diphosphate:isopentenyl-diphosphate farnesyltranstransferase may refer to:

- Hexaprenyl-diphosphate synthase ((2E,6E)-farnesyl-diphosphate specific), an enzyme
- All-trans-octaprenyl-diphosphate synthase, an enzyme
- All-trans-decaprenyl-diphosphate synthase, an enzyme
