= HexPS =

HexPS may stand for:

- Hexaprenyl diphosphate synthase (geranylgeranyl-diphosphate specific), an enzyme
- Hexaprenyl-diphosphate synthase ((2E,6E)-farnesyl-diphosphate specific), an enzyme
