= Indulin =

Indulin may refer to:

- Induline, a series of dyestuffs of blue, bluish-red or black shades
- a trade name for products such as Indulin AA-86, a proprietary fatty amine derivative used as an asphalt emulsifier
