= Trans-prenyltransferase =

Trans-prenyltransferase may refer to:

- All-trans-octaprenyl-diphosphate synthase, an enzyme
- All-trans-decaprenyl-diphosphate synthase, an enzyme
