= Geranylgeranyl-diphosphate:isopentenyl-diphosphate transtransferase =

Geranylgeranyl-diphosphate:isopentenyl-diphosphate transtransferase may refer to:

- Geranylfarnesyl diphosphate synthase, enzyme
- Hexaprenyl diphosphate synthase (geranylgeranyl-diphosphate specific), enzyme
- All-trans-nonaprenyl diphosphate synthase (geranylgeranyl-diphosphate specific), enzyme
