= Hexaprenyl diphosphate synthase =

Hexaprenyl diphosphate synthase (previously known as trans-pentaprenyltranstransferase) may refer to:

- Hexaprenyl diphosphate synthase (geranylgeranyl-diphosphate specific), enzyme
- Hexaprenyl-diphosphate synthase ((2E,6E)-farnesyl-diphosphate specific), enzyme
