= C12H8N2 =

The molecular formula C_{12}H_{8}N_{2} (molar mass: 180.21 g/mol, exact mass: 180.0687 u) may refer to:

- Azepino(4,5-b)indole
- Benzo[c]cinnoline
- Phenanthroline
- Phenazine
