= BMS-345541 =

Chemical compound

Identifiers
- IUPAC name: 4-(2′-Aminoethyl)amino-1,8-dimethylimidazo[1,2-a]quinoxaline
- CAS Number: 445430-58-0
- PubChem CID: 9813758
- IUPHAR/BPS: 5669
- ChemSpider: 7989508
- UNII: 26SU0NEF5F
- ChEMBL: ChEMBL249697
- CompTox Dashboard (EPA): DTXSID60196216

Chemical and physical data
- Formula: C_{14}H_{17}N_{5}
- Molar mass: 255.325 g·mol^{−1}
- 3D model (JSmol): Interactive image
- SMILES: n1c3c(n2c(cnc2c1NCCN)C)cc(cc3)C
- InChI: InChI=1S/C14H17N5/c1-9-3-4-11-12(7-9)19-10(2)8-17-14(19)13(18-11)16-6-5-15/h3-4,7-8H,5-6,15H2,1-2H3,(H,16,18); Key:PSPFQEBFYXJZEV-UHFFFAOYSA-N

BMS-345541, developed by Merck KGaA, is an anti-inflammatory, cell-permeable quinoxaline compound. It is an allosteric site-binding inhibitor with a primary target of IKK-2 and blocks the NF-κB-dependent transcription in mice.

It has no approvals for human/medical use or for use in clinical trials. No clinical trials mention it.
