= C19H23N3 =

The molecular formula C_{19}H_{23}N_{3} (molar mass: 293.41 g/mol, exact mass: 293.1892 u) may refer to:

- Amitraz
- Binedaline, or binodaline
