= Geranylfarnesyl diphosphate synthase =

Enzyme

Identifiers
- EC no.: 2.5.1.81

Databases
- IntEnz: IntEnz view
- BRENDA: BRENDA entry
- ExPASy: NiceZyme view
- KEGG: KEGG entry
- MetaCyc: metabolic pathway
- PRIAM: profile
- PDB structures: RCSB PDB PDBe PDBsum
Search
- PMC: articles
- PubMed: articles
- NCBI: proteins

Geranylfarnesyl diphosphate synthase (EC 2.5.1.81, FGPP synthase, (all-E) geranylfarnesyl diphosphate synthase, GFPS, Fgs) is an enzyme with systematic name geranylgeranyl-diphosphate:isopentenyl-diphosphate transtransferase (adding 1 isopentenyl unit). This enzyme catalyses the following chemical reaction

geranylgeranyl diphosphate + isopentenyl diphosphate $\rightleftharpoons$ (2E,6E,10E,14E)-geranylfarnesyl diphosphate + diphosphate

The enzyme from Methanosarcina mazei is involved in biosynthesis of the polyprenyl side-chain of methanophenazine.
