= Nigrosin =

Mixture of synthetic black dyes

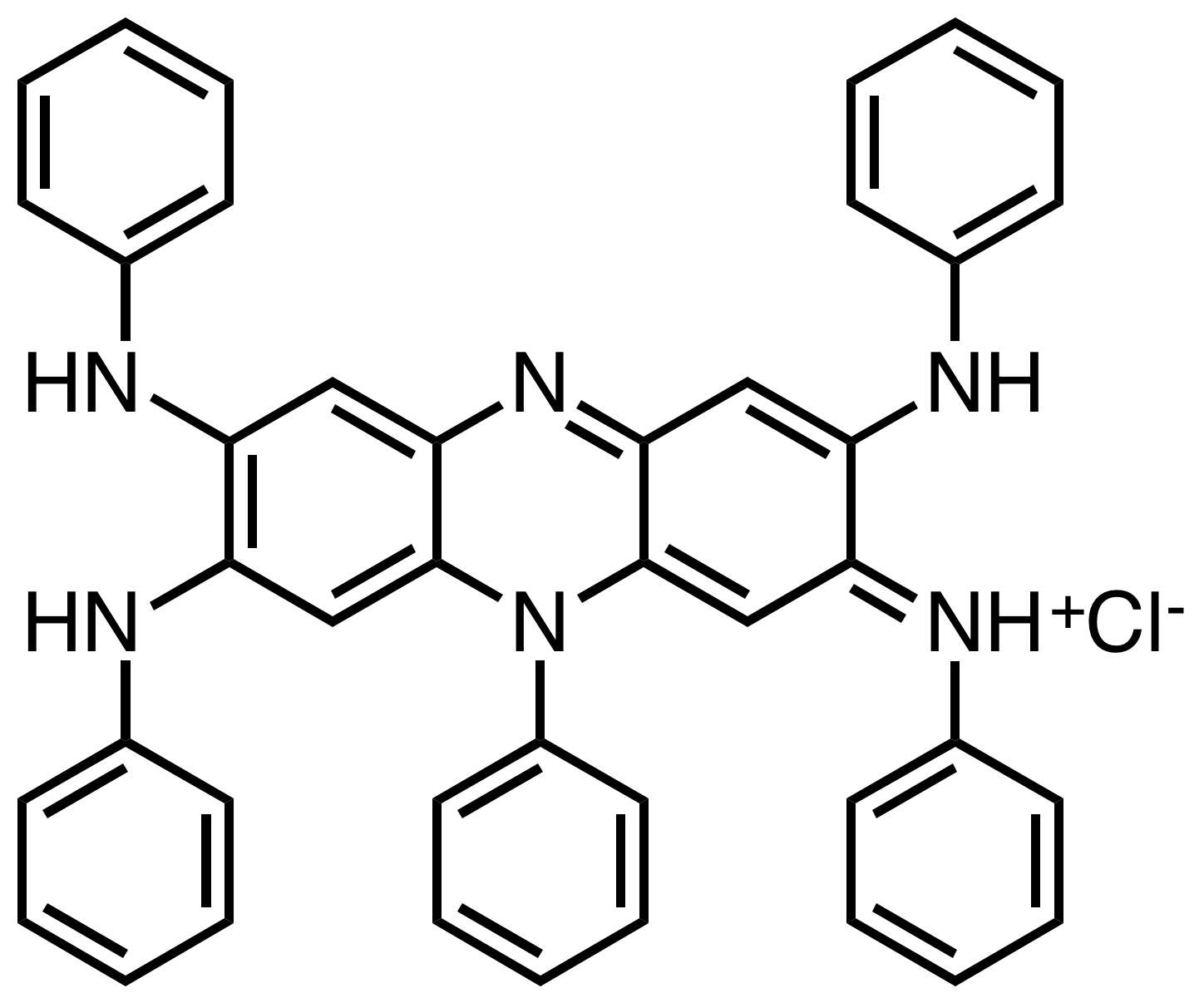
Structure of a major component of the dye nigrosin.

In staining dyes, nigrosin (CI 50415, Solvent black 5) is a mixture of black synthetic dyes made by heating a mixture of nitrobenzene, aniline, and hydrochloric acid in the presence of copper or iron. Related to induline, it is a mixture of phenazine-based compounds. Its main industrial uses are as a colorant for lacquers and varnishes and in marker pen inks. Sulfonation of nigrosin yields a water-soluble anionic dye, nigrosin WS (CI 50420, Acid black 2).

== Uses ==
Aside from its main use in lacquers, small amounts of nigrosin are used for negative staining of bacteria. as well as the capsule-containing fungus Cryptococcus neoformans. The shapes and sizes of the organisms are seen as color-free outlines against the dark background. An advantage of using this method, rather than regular positive stains like methylene blue or carbol fuchsin, is that prior fixation by heat or alcohol is not needed, so the organisms are seen in more lifelike shapes. Furthermore, negative staining with nigrosin can reveal some microorganisms that cannot be stained by regular methods. Nigrosin WS is used in tests for viability because living cells exclude the dye, but it enters dead cells.

Nigrosin has minor application in industrial evaporation as a light-absorbing water-soluble pigment.
