= Methanophenazine =

Names
- IUPAC name 2-{[(3S,6E,10E,14E)-3,7,11,15,19-pentamethylicosa-6,10,14,18-tetraen-1-yl]oxy}phenazine
- Other names (−)-(S)-Methanophenazine

Identifiers
CAS Number	295327-13-8
3D model (JSmol)	Interactive image
ChemSpider	4445251
PubChem CID	5281992
UNII	3458PQ9Q64
CompTox Dashboard (EPA)	DTXSID70467121
- InChI: InChI=1S/C37H50N2O/c1-28(2)13-9-14-29(3)15-10-16-30(4)17-11-18-31(5)19-12-20-32(6)25-26-40-33-23-24-36-37(27-33)39-35-22-8-7-21-34(35)38-36/h7-8,13,15,17,19,21-24,27,32H,9-12,14,16,18,20,25-26H2,1-6H3/b29-15+,30-17+,31-19+
- SMILES: C[C@@H](CC/C=C(C)/CC/C=C(C)/CC/C=C(C)/CC/C=C(C)/C)CCOC1=CC2=NC3=CC=CC=C3N=C2C=C1

Properties
Chemical formula	C_{37}H_{50}N_{2}O
Molar mass	538.820 g·mol^{−1}
- Except where otherwise noted, data are given for materials in their standard state (at 25 °C [77 °F], 100 kPa). Infobox references

Methanophenazine, a phenazine derivative, is a strongly hydrophobic redox-active cofactor with a role in electron transport in some methanogens. This chromophore can be purified from membranes of methanogenic archaea such as Methanosarcina mazei. The enzyme methanosarcina-phenazine hydrogenase (EC 1.12.98.3) has the name methanophenazine hydrogenase as a synonym.
