= Methanosarcina-phenazine hydrogenase =

Identifiers
- EC no.: 1.12.98.3
- CAS no.: 9027-05-8

Databases
- IntEnz: IntEnz view
- BRENDA: BRENDA entry
- ExPASy: NiceZyme view
- KEGG: KEGG entry
- MetaCyc: metabolic pathway
- PRIAM: profile
- PDB structures: RCSB PDB PDBe PDBsum
- Gene Ontology: AmiGO / QuickGO
Search
- PMC: articles
- PubMed: articles
- NCBI: proteins

In enzymology, a Methanosarcina-phenazine hydrogenase (EC 1.12.98.3) is an enzyme that catalyzes the chemical reaction

H_{2} + 2-(2,3-dihydropentaprenyloxy)phenazine $\rightleftharpoons$ 2-dihydropentaprenyloxyphenazine

Thus, the two substrates of this enzyme are H_{2} and 2-(2,3-dihydropentaprenyloxy)phenazine, whereas its product is 2-dihydropentaprenyloxyphenazine.

This enzyme belongs to the family of oxidoreductases, specifically those acting on hydrogen as donor with other, known, acceptors. The systematic name of this enzyme class is hydrogen:2-(2,3-dihydropentaprenyloxy)phenazine oxidoreductase. Other names in common use include methanophenazine hydrogenase, and methylviologen-reducing hydrogenase.
