= Induline =

Induline is a dye of blue, bluish-red or black shades. Induline consists of a mixture of several intensely colored species, so the name is often indulines. It was one of the first synthetic dyes, discovered in 1863 by J. Dale and Heinrich Caro. The main components of induline are various substituted phenazines. Although induline is no longer in use, the related dye nigrosin is still produced commercially.

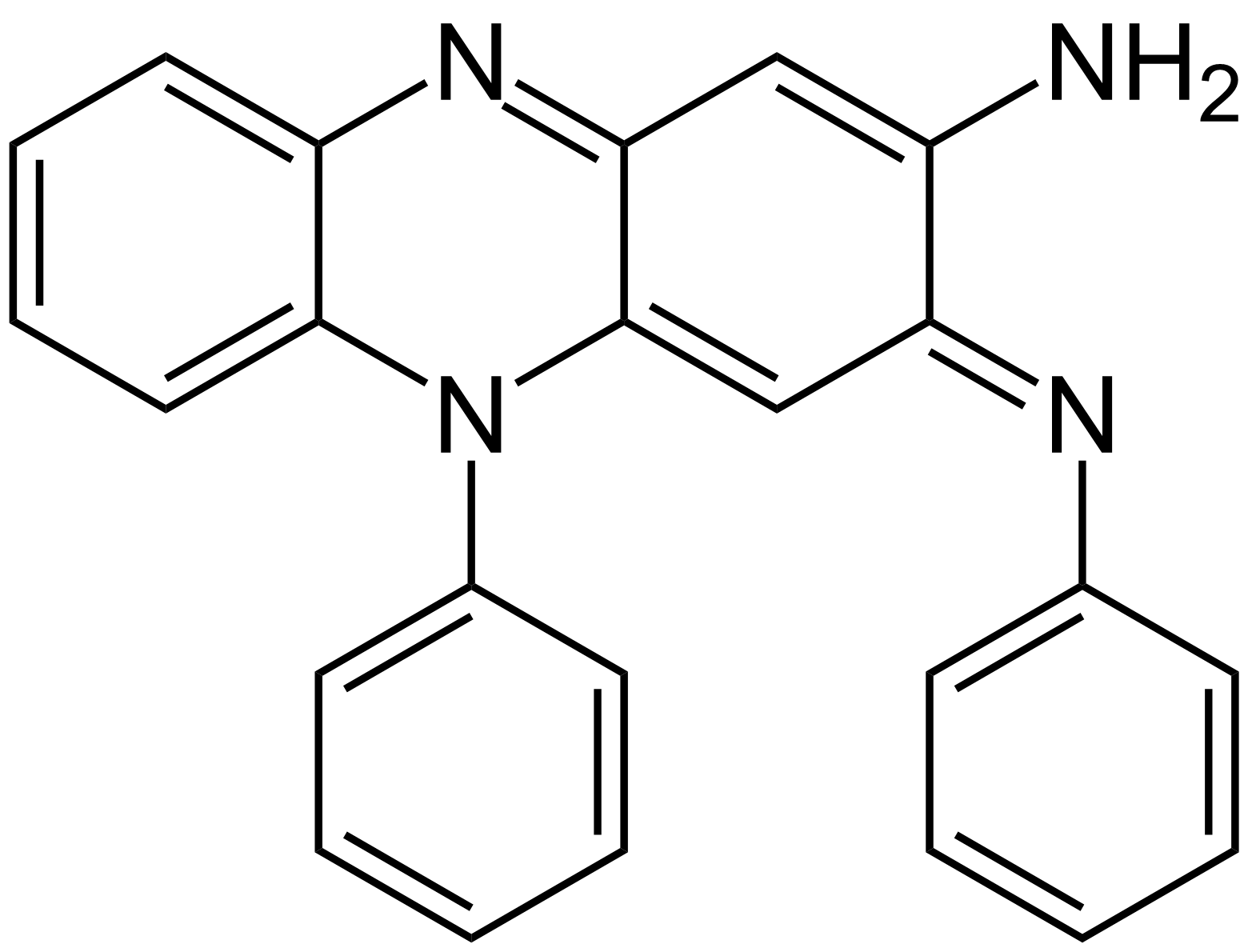
Structure of a major component of the dye induline.

== Relationship to other compounds ==
Induline is a derivative of the eurhodines (aminophenazines, aminonaphthophenazines). By means of their diazo derivatives can be de-amidated, yielding in this way azonium salts; consequently they may be considered as amidated azonium salts. The first reaction giving a clue to their constitution was the isolation of the intermediate azophenin by O. Witt, which was proved by Fischer and Hepp to be dianilidoquinone dianil, a similar intermediate compound being found shortly afterwards in the naphthalene series. Azophenin, C_{30}H_{24}N_{4}, is prepared by warming quinone dianil with aniline, by melting together quinone, aniline and aniline hydrochloride, or by the action of aniline on para-nitrosophenol or para-nitrosodiphenylamine. The indulines are prepared as mentioned above from aminoazo compounds, or by condensing oxy- and amido-quinones with phenylated ortho-diamines. The indulines may be subdivided into the following groups: (1) benzindulines, derivatives of phenazine; (2) isorosindulines; and (3) rosindulines, both derived from naphthophenazine; and (4) naphthindulines, derived from naphthazine.

The rosindulines and naphthindulines have a strongly basic character, and their salts possess a marked red color and fluorescence. Benzinduline (aposafranine), C_{18}H_{13}N_{3}, is a strong base, but cannot be diazotized, unless it be dissolved in concentrated mineral acids. When warmed with aniline it yields anilido-aposafranine, which may also be obtained by the direct oxidation of ortho-aminodiphenylamine. Isorosinduline is obtained from quinone dichlorimide and phenyl-β-naphthylamine; rosinduline from benzene-azo-α-naphthylamine and aniline and naphthinduline from benzene-azo-α-naphthylamine and naphthylamine.
