= Binedaline =

Chemical compound

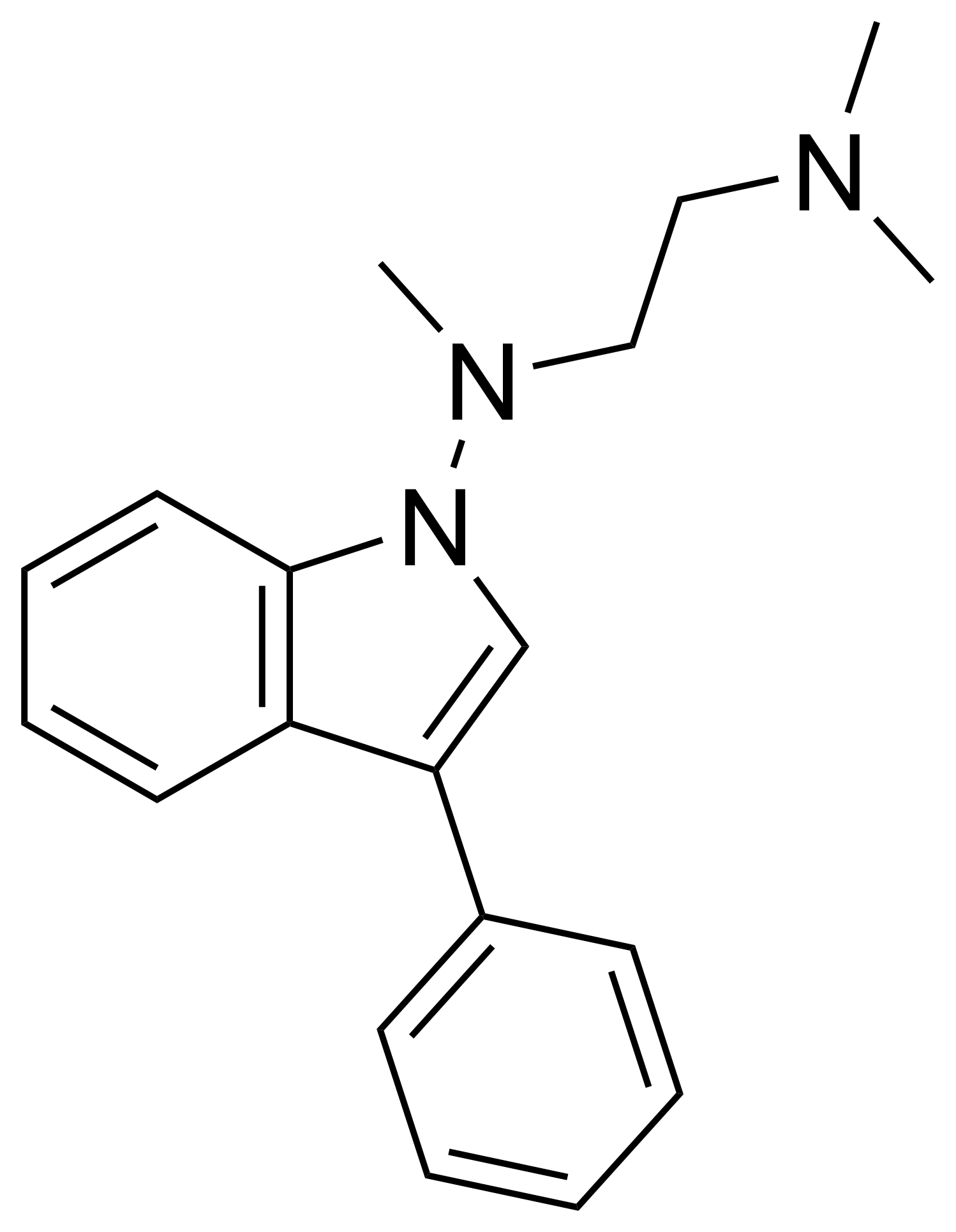

Clinical data
- Routes of administration: Oral
- ATC code: None

Legal status
- Legal status: In general: unscheduled

Identifiers
- IUPAC name: N,N,N-Trimethyl-N-(3-phenylindol-1-yl)ethane-1,2-diamine
- CAS Number: 60662-16-0
- PubChem CID: 42510
- ChemSpider: 38769
- UNII: 3AVG9P140R
- ChEMBL: ChEMBL2104611
- CompTox Dashboard (EPA): DTXSID20209472

Chemical and physical data
- Formula: C_{19}H_{23}N_{3}
- Molar mass: 293.414 g·mol^{−1}
- 3D model (JSmol): Interactive image
- SMILES: c1cccc2c1c(cn2N(CCN(C)C)C)c3ccccc3
- InChI: InChI=1S/C19H23N3/c1-20(2)13-14-21(3)22-15-18(16-9-5-4-6-10-16)17-11-7-8-12-19(17)22/h4-12,15H,13-14H2,1-3H3; Key:SXYFFMXPDDGOEK-UHFFFAOYSA-N

Binedaline (also called binodaline or binedaline hydrochloride) is a drug that was investigated as an antidepressant in the 1980s but was never marketed. It acts as a selective norepinephrine reuptake inhibitor (K_{i} = 25 nM), with relatively insignificant influence on the serotonin (K_{i} = 847 nM) and dopamine (K_{i} >= 2 μM) transporters. It has negligible affinity for the α-adrenergic, mACh, H_{1}, or 5-HT_{2} receptors.

== Synthesis ==
Thieme Synthesis: Patents:

Grignard reaction of 2-aminobenzophenone (1) with methylmagnesium bromide and dehydration of the tertiary carbinol gives 2-(1-phenylvinyl)aniline (2). In an example of the Widman-Stoermer synthesis, treatment with nitrous acid followed by basification of the diazonium species with ammonia causes an intramolecular cyclization to afford 4-phenylcinnoline (3). Hydrogenation gives 4-phenyl-1,4-dihydrocinnoline (4). The presence of acetic acid gives (5). The reaction with methyl p-toluenesulfonate leads to (6). Acid hydrolysis gives N-methyl-3-phenylindol-1-amine (7). Sodamide is then used to abstract the amine proton; alkylation of then anionic species with 2-dimethylaminoethylchloride (8) then concludes the synthesis of binedaline (9).

Widman-Stoermer synthesis also used for the synthesis of cintazone.
