= Geranylfarnesyl pyrophosphate =

Names
- Preferred IUPAC name (2E,6E,10E,14E)-3,7,11,15,19-Pentamethylicosa-2,6,10,14,18-pentaen-1-yl trihydrogen diphosphate

Identifiers
CAS Number	15493-60-4
3D model (JSmol)	Interactive image
ChEBI	CHEBI:16818
ChemSpider	4444258
KEGG	C04217
PubChem CID	5280659
- InChI: InChI=1S/C25H44O7P2/c1-21(2)11-7-12-22(3)13-8-14-23(4)15-9-16-24(5)17-10-18-25(6)19-20-31-34(29,30)32-33(26,27)28/h11,13,15,17,19H,7-10,12,14,16,18,20H2,1-6H3,(H,29,30)(H2,26,27,28)/b22-13+,23-15+,24-17+,25-19+ Key: JMVSBFJBMXQNJW-GIXZANJISA-N; Key: JMVSBFJBMXQNJW-GIXZANJISA-K
- SMILES: CC(=CCC/C(=C/CC/C(=C/CC/C(=C/CC/C(=C/COP(=O)(O)OP(=O)(O)O)/C)/C)/C)/C)C

Properties
Chemical formula	C_{25}H_{44}O_{7}P_{2}
Molar mass	518.568 g·mol^{−1}
- Except where otherwise noted, data are given for materials in their standard state (at 25 °C [77 °F], 100 kPa). Infobox references

Geranylfarnesyl pyrophosphate is an intermediate used by organisms in the biosynthesis of sesterterpenoids.

== Bibliography ==
- Michalak, K.; Michalak, M.; Wicha, J. (2005). "Studies Towards the Total Synthesis of Di- and Sesterterpenes with Dicyclopenta[a,d]cyclooctane Skeletons. Three-component Approach to the A/B Rings Building Block". Molecules. 10 (9): 1084–1100. doi:10.3390/10091084. ISSN 1420-3049. PMC 6147619. PMID 18007374.
