= Indulin AA-86 =

Indulin AA-86 is the trade name (held by Ingevity) for a proprietary formula used for an asphalt emulsifying agent. As such, it does not have a given CAS number. Its composition is only provided subject to a nondisclosure agreement. The company reports that it is a fatty amine derivative, an amber viscous liquid, pH 9 to 11 at a 15% w/w concentration, reactive with acids and oxidizing agents, with a relative density of 0.89, boiling point greater than 180 C and a closed cup flash point of 126 C. It is not volatile, but is identified as a hazard for inhalation, eye or skin contact and must be used with adequate ventilation. The compound is stable and hazardous decomposition products should not be produced during normal use, but in a fire can produce carbon dioxide, carbon monoxide and nitrogen oxides, so firefighters are advised to wear self-contained breathing apparatus. State regulatory disclosures indicate it contains ethyl acrylate. According to the US EPA, "the hydrochloric salt of this product is only acceptable for use in the production of asphalt emulsions, and the emulsions may only be used in asphalt paving applications." Standard usage involves partial neutralization of basic indulin with hydrochloric acid to form a salt, for a 1.0:1.1 ratio of indulin to its salt.

== Corpus Christi water system incident ==
The compound is notable for a backflow of up to 24 gallons of the material, possibly in a mixture with hydrochloric acid, into the city water supply of Corpus Christi, Texas, leading to a temporary ban (December 14, 2016) on use of tap water throughout the city of 320,000 residents. The ban remained in place in 85% of the city for more than two days, leading to school closures and emergency deliveries of bottled water, after which restrictions were tailored (December 17) to smaller portions of the city. City officials posted a warning to residents that "Boiling, freezing, filtering, adding chlorine or other disinfectants or letting the water stand will not make the water safe." The material originated from a plant leased to Ergon Asphalt and Emulsions on property adjacent to one of the two Valero refineries in the city's large refinery complex. A "white, sudsy liquid" was reported to the city at taps in the company's administration building on December 1 and then, after city workers had flushed the pipe, on December 7, and finally, after a third flush, reported again by Valero workers at the building on December 12. A Valero spokesman described the contamination as "a localized backflow issue from third party operations in the area of Valero's asphalt terminal" and said that the company did not believe the city water had been impacted. It was reported December 17 that city officials were investigating four cases of skin and intestinal issues that were consistent with possible symptoms of exposure, but these claims were dismissed by Mayor Dan McQueen as "rumors", and twelve "reports of possibly related symptoms from prohibited water use" were described as "unconfirmed" by the EPA. The ban was lifted December 18 after 28 samples of city water failed to find Indulin AA-86 contamination.

The solubility of the compound is thought to be relatively low. A blog for Hydroviv, a water filter manufacturer, suggested that the presence of hydrochloric acid might hint at the nature of the backflow: "Indulin AA-86 is prepared in a 0.3% solution to form an emulsion. Therefore, for 24 gallons of Indulin AA-86 would be diluted with water into 8,000 gallons, a volume that is a standard storage/mixing tank size in the industry." The diluted emulsion would be more capable of mixing with the city water supply during a backflow. A statement by Ergon said that it purchases its water via Valero, its landlord at the site, and that a soap solution, consisting of 98% water and 2% indulin AA-86, would have backflowed through this separate supply line.
