= 1,8-Naphthyridine =

Names
- Preferred IUPAC name 1,8-Naphthyridine

Identifiers
CAS Number	254-60-4
3D model (JSmol)	Interactive image
Beilstein Reference	109347
ChEBI	CHEBI:36628
ChEMBL	ChEMBL261758
ChemSpider	119846
ECHA InfoCard	100.201.052
EC Number	675-799-8
Gmelin Reference	27124
PubChem CID	136069
UNII	043R04VL4M
CompTox Dashboard (EPA)	DTXSID40180052
- InChI: InChI=1S/C8H6N2/c1-3-7-4-2-6-10-8(7)9-5-1/h1-6H Key: FLBAYUMRQUHISI-UHFFFAOYSA-N
- SMILES: C1=CC2=C(N=C1)N=CC=C2

Properties
Chemical formula	C_{8}H_{6}N_{2}
Molar mass	130.150 g·mol^{−1}
Appearance	yellow solid
Density	1.359 g/cm^{3}
Melting point	98–99 °C (208–210 °F; 371–372 K)

Hazards
- GHS labelling
Pictograms	(GHS07: Exclamation mark)
Signal word	Warning
Hazard statements	H315, H319, H335
Precautionary statements	P261, P264, P271, P280, P302+P352, P304+P340, P305+P351+P338, P312, P321, P332+P313, P337+P313, P362, P403+P233, P405, P501
- Except where otherwise noted, data are given for materials in their standard state (at 25 °C [77 °F], 100 kPa). Infobox references

1,8-Naphthyridine is an organic compound with the formula C_{8}H_{6}N_{2}. It is the most well-studied of the six isomeric naphthyridines, a subset of diazanaphthalenes with nitrogen in the separate rings. Enoxacin, nalidixic acid, and trovafloxacin are 1,8-naphthyridine derivatives with antibacterial properties related to the fluoroquinolones.

== Coordination chemistry ==
With flanking nitrogen centers, 1,8-naphthyridine serves as a binucleating ligand in coordination chemistry.
