= Diazanaphthalene =

Diazanaphthalenes are a class of aromatic heterocyclic chemical compounds that have the formula C_{8}H_{6}N_{2}. They consist of a naphthalene double ring in which two of the carbon atoms have been replaced with nitrogen atoms. There are ten positional isomers, which differ by the locations of the nitrogen atoms.

The group consist of two subgroups:

- four benzodiazines with both N atoms in one ring: cinnoline, quinazoline, quinoxaline, and phthalazine
- six naphthyridines with one N atom in each ring

== Isomers ==
Names	Structure	Subgroup	CAS RN
1,2-diazanaphthalene (cinnoline)		benzodiazine	253-66-7
2,3-diazanaphthalene (phthalazine)		benzodiazine	253-52-1
1,3-diazanaphthalene (quinazoline)		benzodiazine	253-82-7
1,4-diazanaphthalene (quinoxaline)		benzodiazine	91-19-0
1,7-naphthyridine (1,7-diazanaphthalene)		naphthyridine	253-69-0
1,8-Naphthyridine (1,8-diazanaphthalene)		naphthyridine	254-60-4
2,7-naphthyridine (2,7-diazanaphthalene)		naphthyridine	253-45-2
1,6-naphthyridine (1,6-diazanaphthalene)		naphthyridine	253-72-5
1,5-naphthyridine (1,5-diazanaphthalene)		naphthyridine	254-79-5
2,6-naphthyridine (2,6-diazanaphthalene)		naphthyridine	253-50-9
