= Phenazine =

- Skeletal formula of phenazine

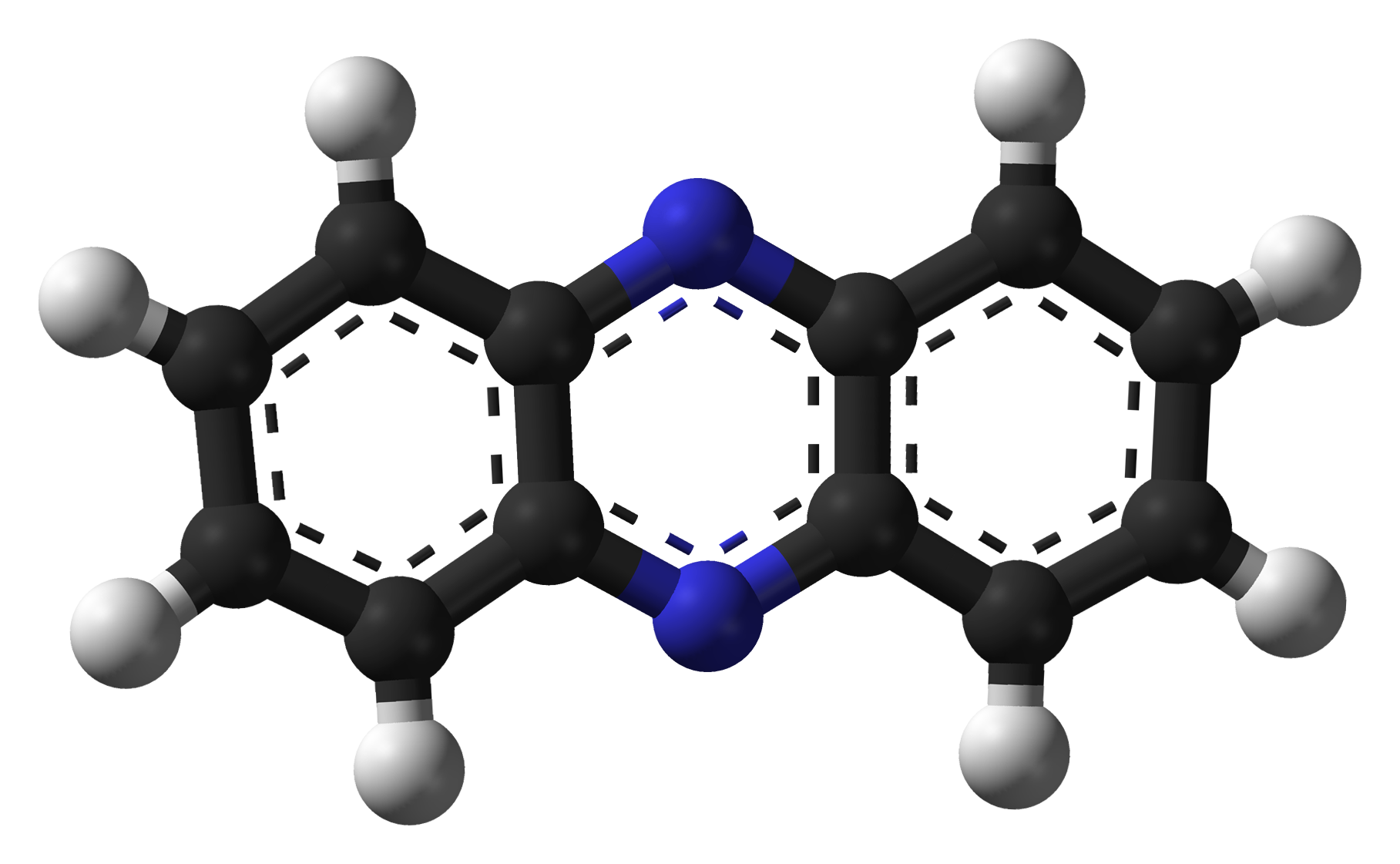
- Ball-and-stick model

Names
- Preferred IUPAC name Phenazine
- Other names Dibenzopyrazine; 9,10-Diazaanthracene; Azophenylene acridizine

Identifiers
CAS Number	92-82-0
3D model (JSmol)	Interactive image
ChEBI	CHEBI:36674
ChEMBL	ChEMBL119870
ChemSpider	4593
ECHA InfoCard	100.001.995
EC Number	202-193-9
Gmelin Reference	201469
KEGG	C21476
PubChem CID	4757
UNII	2JHR6K463W
CompTox Dashboard (EPA)	DTXSID2059069
- InChI: InChI=1S/C12H8N2/c1-2-6-10-9(5-1)13-11-7-3-4-8-12(11)14-10/h1-8H Key: PCNDJXKNXGMECE-UHFFFAOYSA-N; InChI=1/C12H8N2/c1-2-6-10-9(5-1)13-11-7-3-4-8-12(11)14-10/h1-8H Key: PCNDJXKNXGMECE-UHFFFAOYAM
- SMILES: n1c3c(nc2c1cccc2)cccc3

Properties
Chemical formula	C_{12}H_{8}N_{2}
Molar mass	180.21 g/mol
Appearance	yellow to brown crystalline powder
Density	1.25g/cm^{3}
Melting point	174–177 °C (345–351 °F; 447–450 K)
Boiling point	357.2 °C (675.0 °F; 630.3 K) at 760 mmHg
Solubility in water	insoluble in water

Hazards
Flash point	160.3 °C (320.5 °F; 433.4 K)
- Except where otherwise noted, data are given for materials in their standard state (at 25 °C [77 °F], 100 kPa). verify (what is ?) Infobox references

Phenazine is an organic compound with the formula (C_{6}H_{4})_{2}N_{2}. It is a dibenzo annulated pyrazine, and the parent substance of many dyestuffs, such as the toluylene red, indulines, and safranines (and the closely related eurhodines). Phenazine crystallizes in yellow needles, which are only sparingly soluble in alcohol. Sulfuric acid dissolves it, forming a deep-red solution.

== Synthesis ==
Classically phenazine are prepared by the reaction of nitrobenzene and aniline in the Wohl–Aue reaction. Other methods include:

- pyrolysis of the barium salt of azobenzoate
- oxidation of aniline with lead oxide
- oxidation of dihydrophenazine, which is prepared by heating pyrocatechin with o-phenylenediamine.
- oxidation of ortho-aminodiphenylamine with lead peroxide.

== Derivatives ==
The phenazine complex [Ru(phen)_{2}(dipyrido[3,2-a:2‘,3‘-c]phenazine)]^{2+} intercalates into DNA.

- The more complex phenazines, such as the naphthophenazines, naphthazines, and naphthotolazines, may be prepared by condensing ortho-diamines with ortho-quinones or by the oxidation of an ortho-diamine in the presence of α-naphthol, and by the decomposition of ortho-anilido-(-toluidido- et cetera)- azo compounds with dilute acids.
- If alkyl or aryl-ortho-diamines be used, azonium bases are obtained. The azines are mostly yellow in color, distill unchanged and are stable to oxidants. They add on alkyl iodides readily, forming alkyl azonium salts, anhydride formation also taking place between these hydroxylgroups. It dissolves in concentrated sulfuric acid with a yellowish-green fluorescence.
- The rhodamines, which are closely related to the phthaleins, are formed by the condensation of the alkyl metaaminophenols with phthalic anhydride in the presence of sulfuric acid. Their salts are fine red dyes. By the entrance of amino or hydroxyl groups into the molecule dyestuffs are formed. The mono-amino derivatives or eurhodines are obtained when the arylmonamines are condensed with orthoamino azo compounds; by condensing quinone dichlorimide or para-nitrosodimethyl aniline with monoamines containing a free para position, or by oxidizing ortho-hydroxydiaminodipbenylamines. They are yellowish-red solids, which behave as weak bases, their salts undergoing hydrolytic dissociation in aqueous solution. When heated with concentrated hydrochloric acid the amino group is replaced by the hydroxyl group and the phenolic eurhodols are produced.

=== Aminophenazine ===
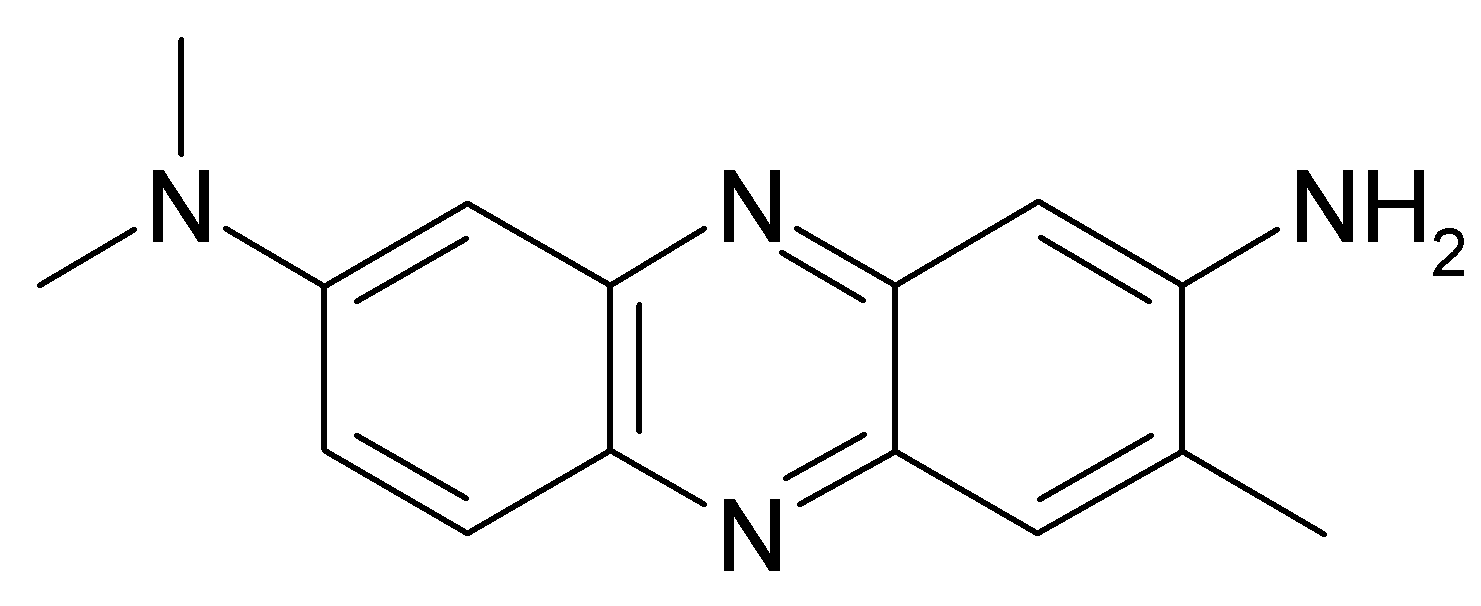
Neutral red

Many aminophenazines are prominent dyes. Two of the first synthetic dyes are aminophenazines, these include induline and nigrosin.

The symmetrical diaminophenazine is the parent substance of the important dyestuff neutral red (dimethyldiaminotoluphenazine). It is obtained by the oxidation of ortho-phenylenediamine with ferric chloride.

In a related process, oxidation of a cold mixture of para-aminodimethylaniline and meta-toluylenediamine gives toluylene blue. This indamine is formed as an intermediate product and passing into the red when boiled; and also by the oxidation of dimethylparaphenylene diatnine with metatoluylene diamine. It crystallizes in orange-red needles and its alcoholic solution fluoresces strongly. It dyes silk and mordanted cotton a fine scarlet. It is known commercially as neutral red. For the phenazonium salts, see safranine. Benzo[c]cinnoline is an isomer of phenazine, to which it bears the same relation that phenanthrene bears to anthracene.

== Natural products ==
The known biological sources of phenazine compounds are mostly bacterial in nature. Some of the genera known to produce phenazines include Pseudomonas spp., Streptomyces spp., and Pantoea agglomerans. These phenazine natural products have been implicated in the virulence and competitive fitness of producing organisms. For example, the phenazine pyocyanin produced by Pseudomonas aeruginosa contributes to its ability to colonise the lungs of cystic fibrosis patients. Similarly, phenazine-1-carboxylic acid, produced by a number of Pseudomonads, increases survival in soil environments and has been shown to be essential for the biological control activity of certain strains.

While bacterial phenazines are principally involved in secondary metabolisms, methanophenazine in methanogenic archaea (methanogens) is involved in primary metabolisms and are important electron carriers. Methanophenazine acts as the functional equivalent of menaquinones and ubiquinones in other organisms. Methanophenazine is only known phenazine of non-bacterial origin and also is the only phenazine that engages in primary metabolisms.

== Biosynthesis ==
Phenazine biosynthesis branches off the shikimic acid pathway at a point subsequent to chorismic acid. Two molecules of this chorismate-derived intermediate are then brought together in a diagonally-symmetrical fashion to form the basic phenazine scaffold. Sequential modifications then lead to a variety of phenazine with differing biological activities. An example of phenazinic alkaloids are pyocyanin, saphenic acid and esmeraldins.

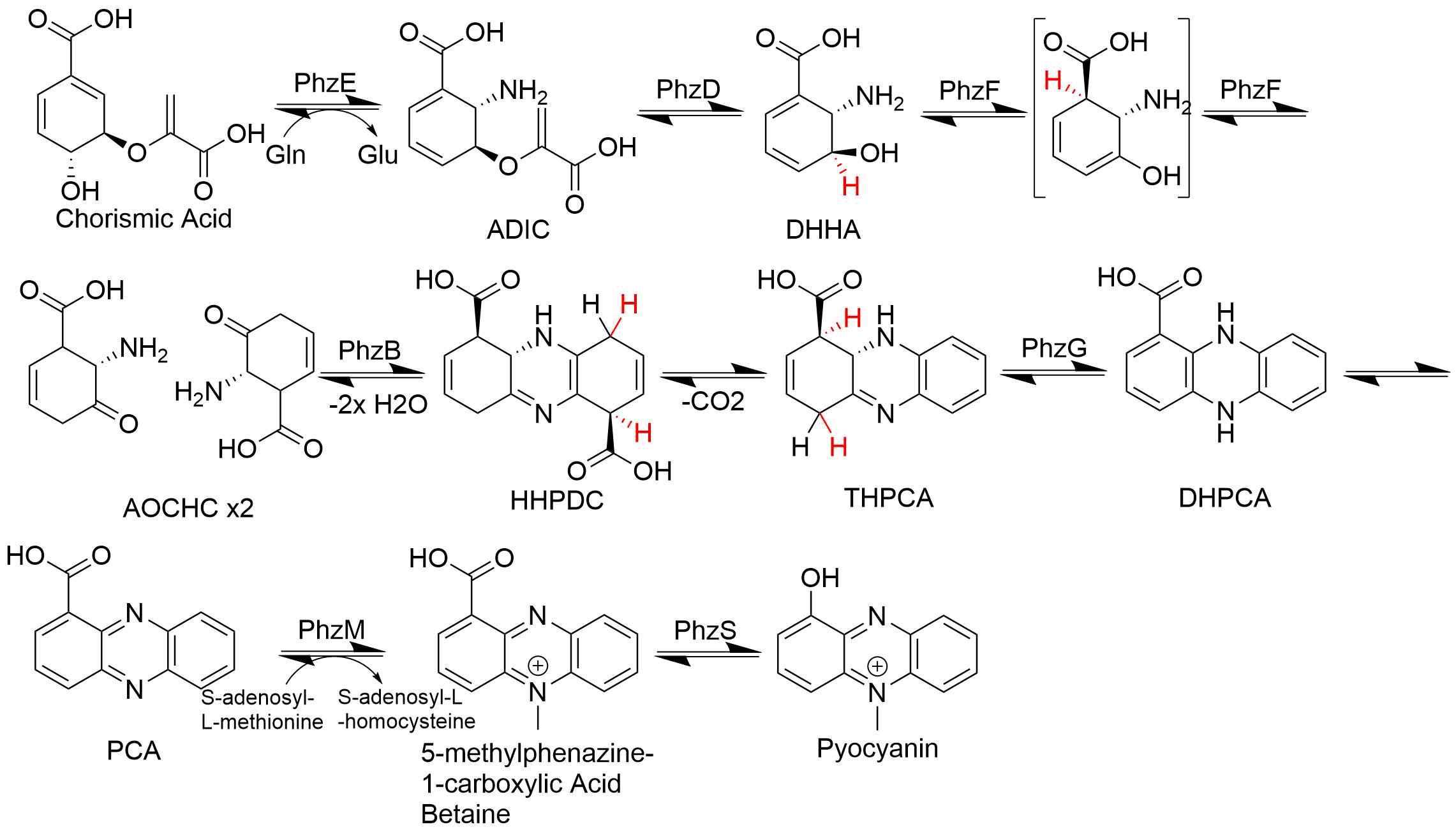
