= Benzo(c)cinnoline =

Chemical compound

Benzo[c]cinnoline
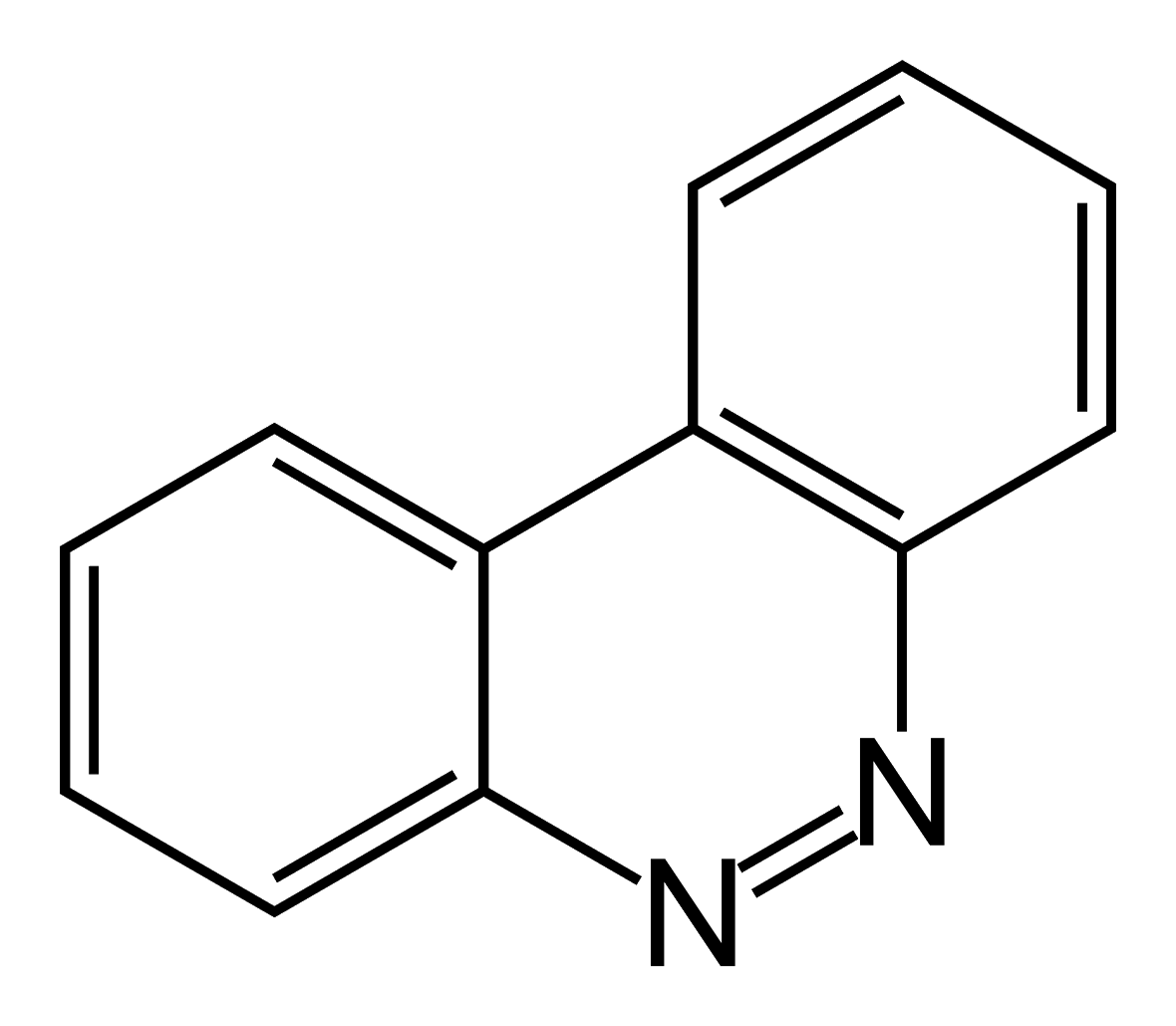

Names
- Preferred IUPAC name Benzo[c]cinnoline
- Other names Diphenylenazone; phenazone; 9,10-diazaphenanthrene; 2,2'-azobiphenyl; 3,4-benzocinnoline; 5,6-phenanthroline

Identifiers
CAS Number	230-17-1
3D model (JSmol)	Interactive image
ChemSpider	8835
PubChem CID	9190
UNII	P346MC4QRL
CompTox Dashboard (EPA)	DTXSID8074289
- InChI: InChI=1S/C12H8N2/c1-3-7-11-9(5-1)10-6-2-4-8-12(10)14-13-11/h1-8H Key: SWJXWSAKHXBQSY-UHFFFAOYSA-N; InChI=1/C12H8N2/c1-3-7-11-9(5-1)10-6-2-4-8-12(10)14-13-11/h1-8H Key: SWJXWSAKHXBQSY-UHFFFAOYAY
- SMILES: C1=CC=C2C(=C1)C3=CC=CC=C3N=N2

Properties
Chemical formula	C_{12}H_{8}N_{2}
Molar mass	180.21 g/mol
- Except where otherwise noted, data are given for materials in their standard state (at 25 °C [77 °F], 100 kPa). verify (what is ?) Infobox references

Benzo[c]cinnoline is a tricyclic organic compound with the formula C_{12}H_{8}N_{2}. Formally this species is derived by oxidative dehydrogenation of 2,2'-diaminobiphenyl. This heterocycle reacts with iron carbonyls to form C_{12}H_{8}N_{2}Fe_{2}(CO)_{6}.

== See also ==
- Cinnoline
