= Phthalazine =

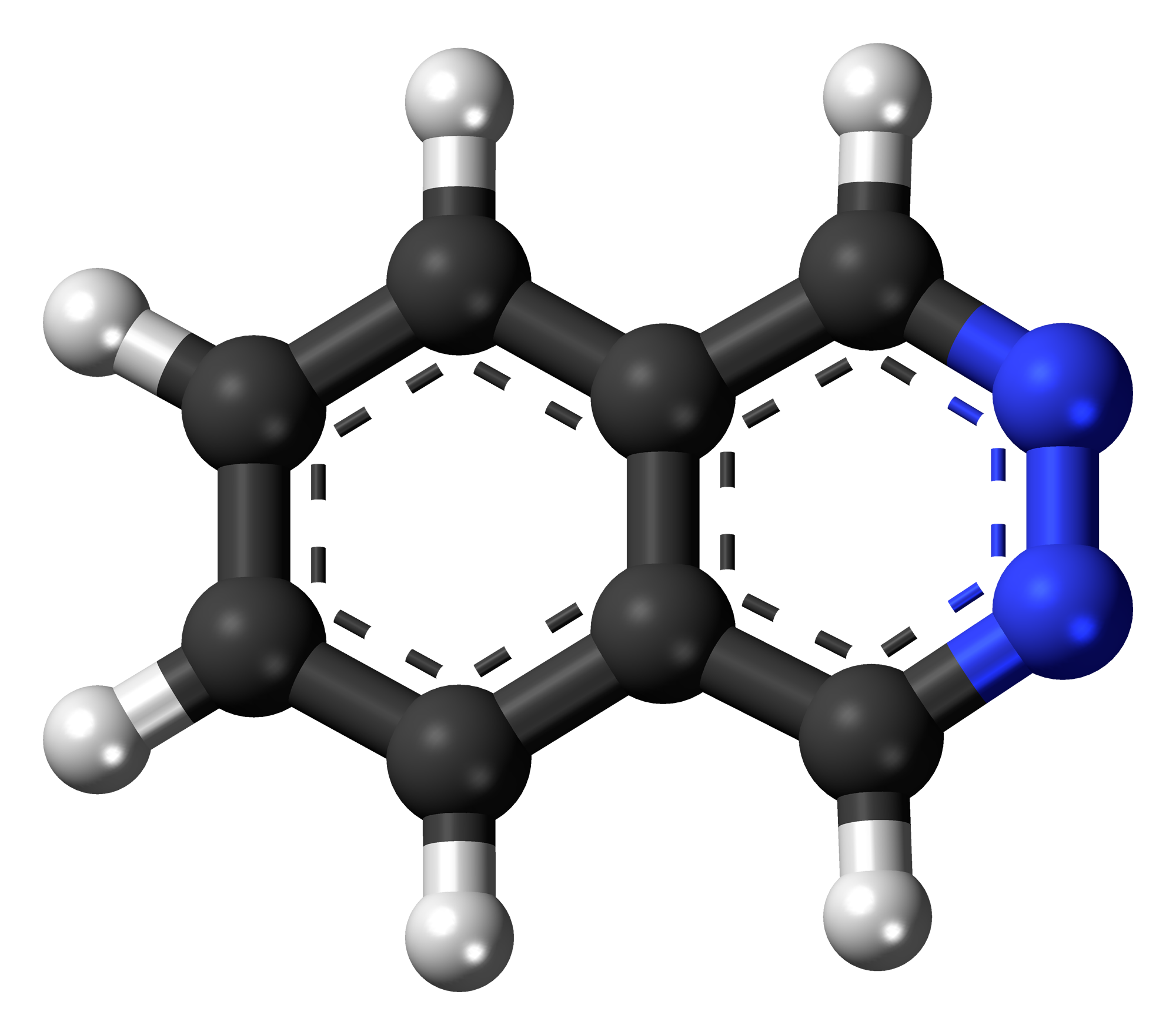

Names
- Preferred IUPAC name Phthalazine
- Other names Benzo-orthodiazine; 2,3-Benzodiazine; Benzo[d]pyridazine

Identifiers
| CAS Number | 253-52-1 |
| 3D model (JSmol) | Interactive image |
| ChemSpider | 8852 |
| ECHA InfoCard | 100.005.422 |
| PubChem CID | 9207 |
| UNII | 91Y28DM24N |
| CompTox Dashboard (EPA) | DTXSID9049407 |
- InChI: InChI=1S/C8H6N2/c1-2-4-8-6-10-9-5-7(8)3-1/h1-6H Key: LFSXCDWNBUNEEM-UHFFFAOYSA-N; InChI=1/C8H6N2/c1-2-4-8-6-10-9-5-7(8)3-1/h1-6H Key: LFSXCDWNBUNEEM-UHFFFAOYAE
- SMILES: C1=CC=C2C=NN=CC2=C1

Properties
| Chemical formula | C_{8}H_{6}N_{2} |
| Molar mass | 130.150 g·mol^{−1} |
| Appearance | Pale yellow needles |
| Melting point | 90 to 91 °C (194 to 196 °F; 363 to 364 K) |
| Boiling point | 315 to 317 °C (599 to 603 °F; 588 to 590 K) (decomposition) |
| Solubility in water | Miscible |
| Acidity (pK_{a}) | 3.39 |
- Except where otherwise noted, data are given for materials in their standard state (at 25 °C [77 °F], 100 kPa). verify (what is ?) Infobox references

Phthalazine, also called benzo-orthodiazine or benzopyridazine, is a heterocyclic organic compound with the molecular formula C_{8}H_{6}N_{2}. It is isomeric with other naphthyridines including quinoxaline, cinnoline and quinazoline.

== Synthesis ==
Phthalazine can be obtained by the condensation of ω-tetrabromorthoxylene with hydrazine, or by the reduction of chlorphthalazine with phosphorus and hydroiodic acid.

== Properties ==
It possesses basic properties and forms addition products with alkyl iodides.

== Reactions ==
Upon oxidation with alkaline potassium permanganate it yields pyridazine dicarboxylic acid. Zinc and hydrochloric acid decompose it with formation of orthoxylylene diamine. The keto-hydro derivative phthalazone (C_{8}H_{6}ON_{2}), is obtained by condensing hydrazine with orthophthalaldehydoacid. On treatment with phosphorus oxychloride, it yields a chlorphthalazine, which with zinc and hydrochloric acid gives isoindole (C_{8}H_{7}N), and with tin and hydrochloric acid, phthalimidine (C_{8}H_{7}ON), the second nitrogen atom being eliminated as ammonia.
