= Cinnoline =

Chemical compound

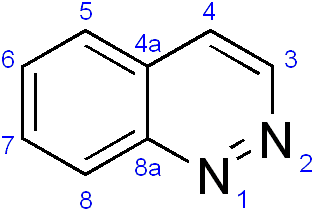

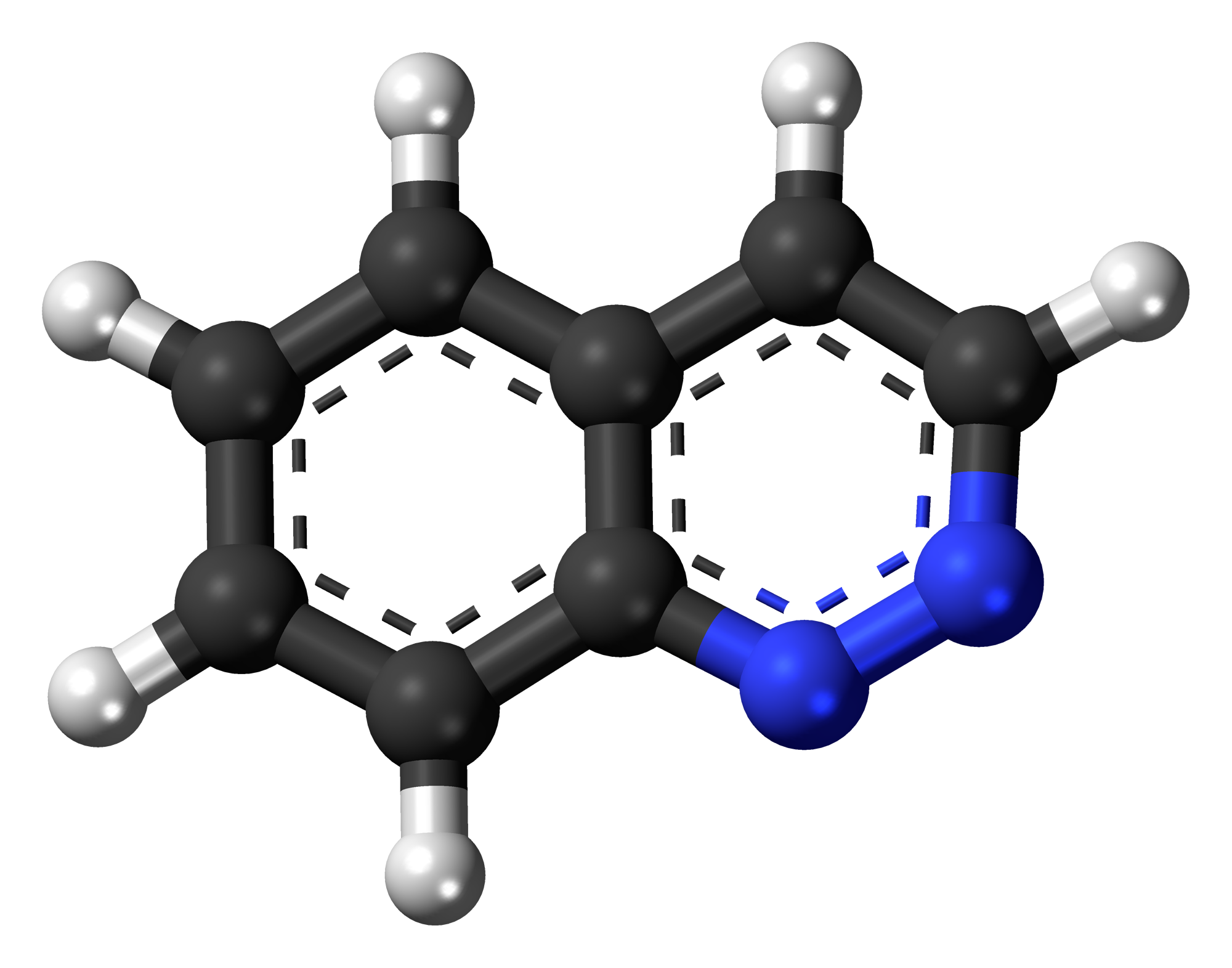
C=black, H=white, N=blue
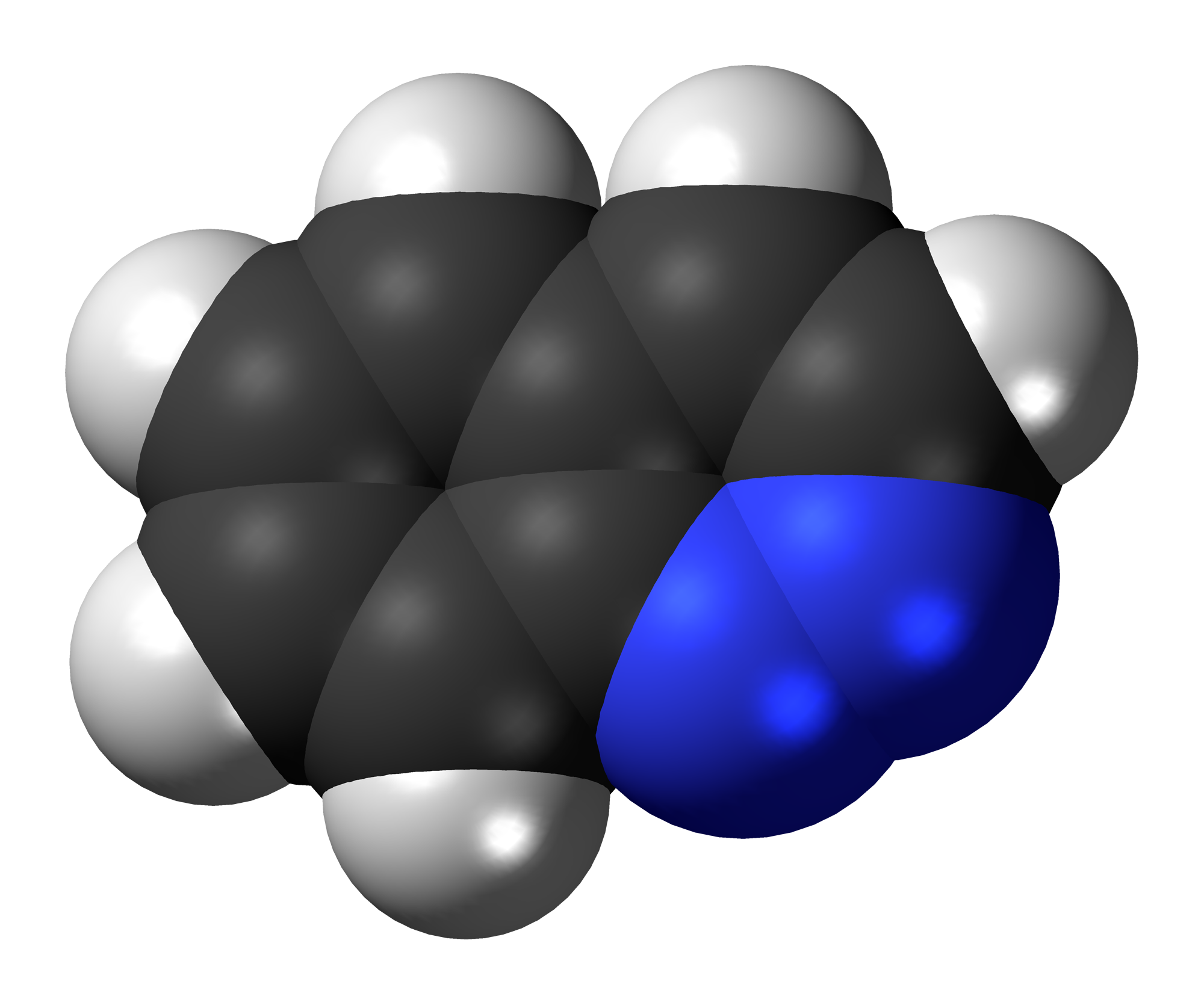
C=black, H=white, N=blue

Names
- Preferred IUPAC name Cinnoline
- Other names Benzopyridazine

Identifiers
CAS Number	253-66-7
3D model (JSmol)	Interactive image
ChEBI	CHEBI:36617
ChEMBL	ChEMBL479792
ChemSpider	8853
ECHA InfoCard	100.005.423
EC Number	205-964-8
Gmelin Reference	1126565
PubChem CID	9208
UNII	N5KD6I506O
CompTox Dashboard (EPA)	DTXSID60179943
- InChI: InChI=1S/C8H6N2/c1-2-4-8-7(3-1)5-6-9-10-8/h1-6H Key: WCZVZNOTHYJIEI-UHFFFAOYSA-N; InChI=1/C8H6N2/c1-2-4-8-7(3-1)5-6-9-10-8/h1-6H Key: WCZVZNOTHYJIEI-UHFFFAOYAA
- SMILES: n1nccc2ccccc12

Properties
Chemical formula	C_{8}H_{6}N_{2}
Molar mass	130.150 g·mol^{−1}
Melting point	39 °C (102 °F; 312 K)
Acidity (pK_{a})	2.64
- Except where otherwise noted, data are given for materials in their standard state (at 25 °C [77 °F], 100 kPa). verify (what is ?) Infobox references

Cinnoline is an aromatic heterocyclic compound with the formula C_{8}H_{6}N_{2}. It is isomeric with other naphthyridines including quinoxaline, phthalazine and quinazoline. Neither the unsubstituted heterocycle nor any derivatives is known to occur naturally.

== Properties ==
The free base can be obtained as an oil by treatment of the hydrochloride with base. It co-crystallizes with one molecule of ether as white silky needles, (m.p. 24–25 °C or 75.2–77.0 °F) upon cooling ethereal solutions. The free base melts at 39 °C or 102.2 °F. It has a taste resembling that of chloral hydrate and leaves a sharp irritation for some time.

== Discovery and synthesis ==
The compound was first obtained in impure form by cyclization of the alkyne o-C_{6}H_{4}(N_{2}Cl)C≡CCO_{2}H in water to give 4-hydroxycinnoline-3-carboxylic acid. This material could be decarboxylated and the hydroxyl group reductively removed to give the parent heterocycle. This reaction is called the Richter cinnoline synthesis.

Improved methods exist for its synthesis. It can be prepared by dehydrogenation of dihydrocinnoline with freshly precipitated mercuric oxide. It can be isolated as the hydrochloride.

Cinnolines are cinnoline derivatives. A classic organic reaction for synthesizing cinnolines is the Widman–Stoermer synthesis, a ring-closing reaction of an α-vinyl- aniline with hydrochloric acid and sodium nitrite:

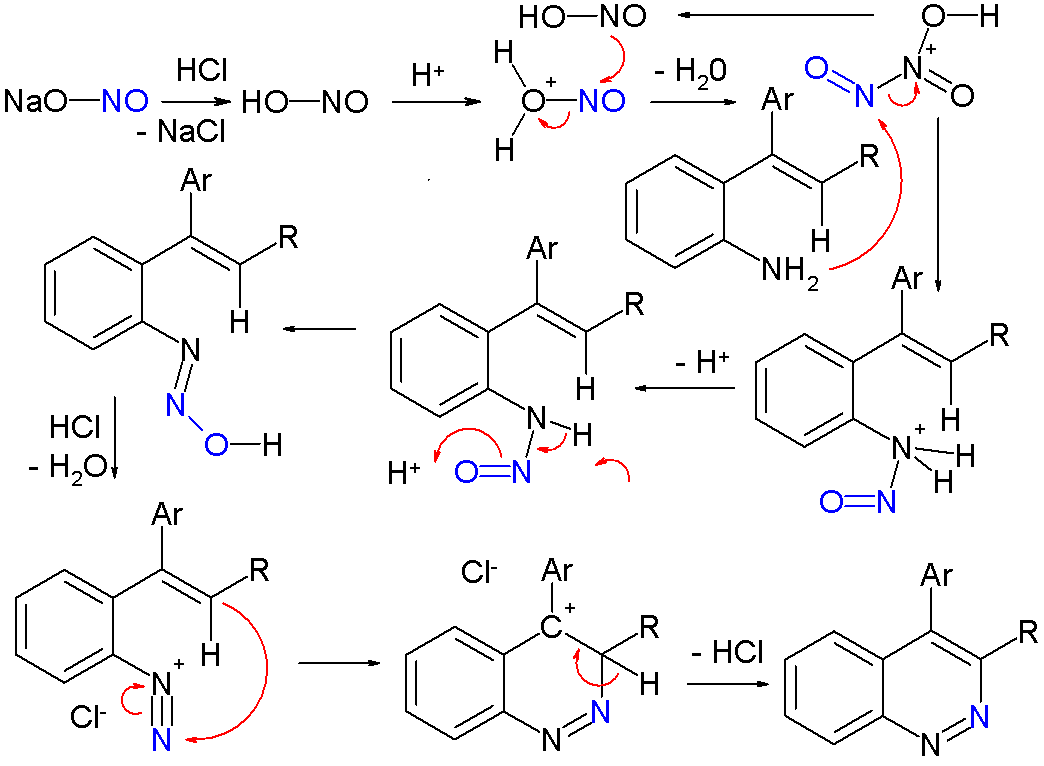
Widman–Stoermer reaction

The Widman–Stoermer synthesis is of fundamental importance in the synthesis of binedaline.

A conceptually related reaction is the Bamberger triazine synthesis towards triazines.

Another cinnoline method is the Borsche cinnoline synthesis.

== Safety ==
Cinnoline is toxic.

== See also ==
- Benzo[c]cinnoline
