= Quinazoline =

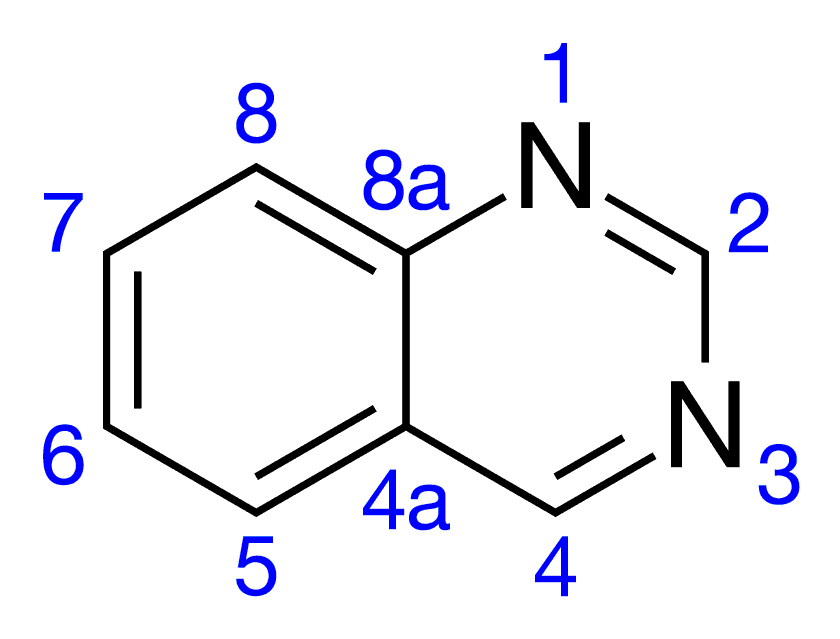

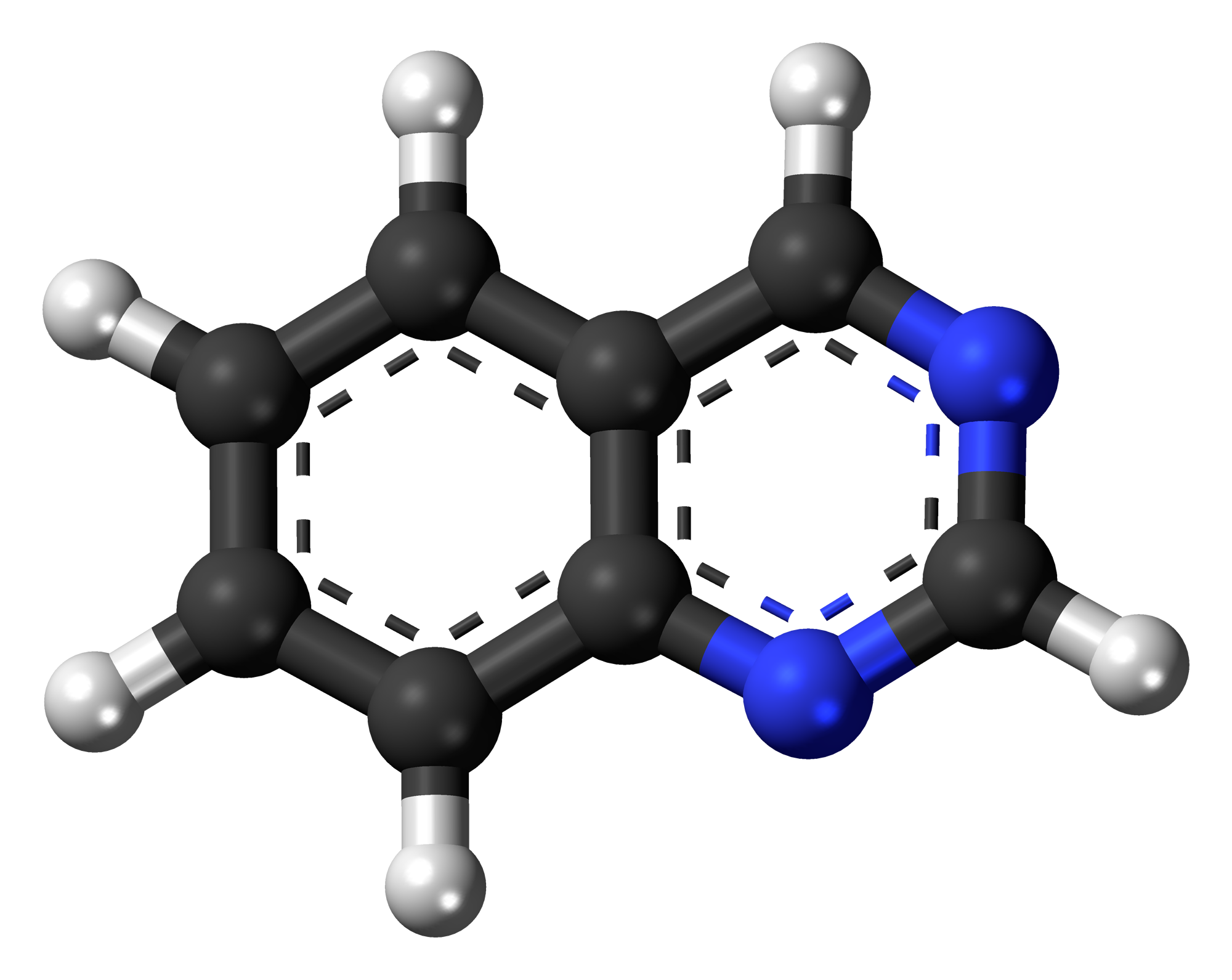
C=black, H=white, N=blue
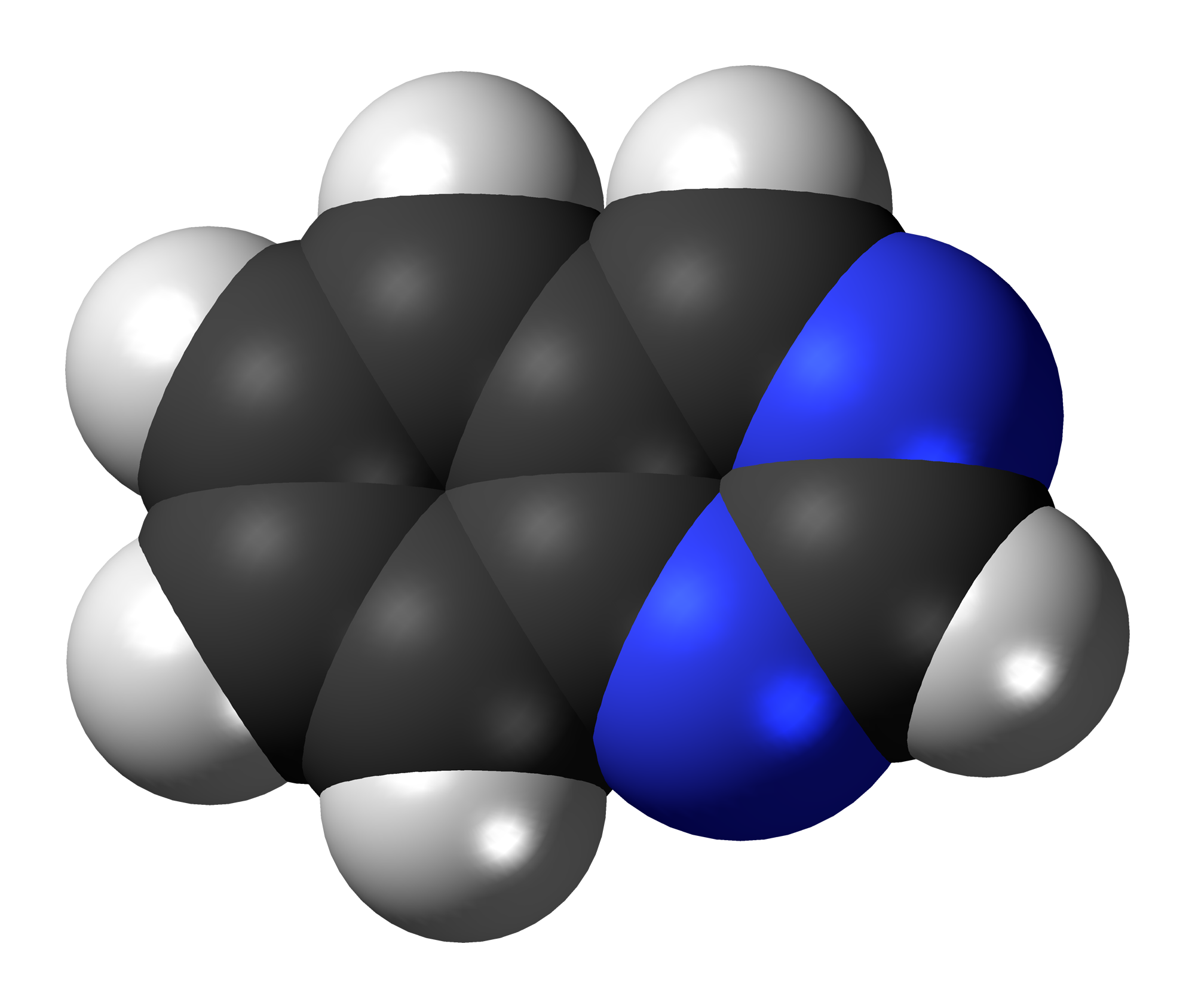
C=black, H=white, N=blue

Names
- Preferred IUPAC name Quinazoline
- Other names 1,3-diazanaphthalene benzopyrimidine phenmiazine benzo-1,3-diazine

Identifiers
| CAS Number | 253-82-7 |
| 3D model (JSmol) | Interactive image |
| Beilstein Reference | 109370 |
| ChEBI | CHEBI:36621 |
| ChEMBL | ChEMBL301359 |
| ChemSpider | 8855 |
| ECHA InfoCard | 100.005.424 |
| EC Number | 205-965-3 |
| Gmelin Reference | 663230 |
| PubChem CID | 9210 |
| UNII | UB9QUR18NL |
| CompTox Dashboard (EPA) | DTXSID7075214 |
- InChI: InChI=1S/C8H6N2/c1-2-4-8-7(3-1)5-9-6-10-8/h1-6H Key: JWVCLYRUEFBMGU-UHFFFAOYSA-N; InChI=1/C8H6N2/c1-2-4-8-7(3-1)5-9-6-10-8/h1-6H Key: JWVCLYRUEFBMGU-UHFFFAOYAV
- SMILES: c1ccc2c(c1)cncn2

Properties
| Chemical formula | C_{8}H_{6}N_{2} |
| Molar mass | 130.150 g·mol^{−1} |
| Appearance | light yellow crystals |
| Density | 1.351 g/cm^{3}, solid |
| Melting point | 48 °C (118 °F; 321 K) |
| Boiling point | 243 °C (469 °F; 516 K) |
| Solubility in water | Soluble |
| Acidity (pK_{a}) | 3.51 |

Structure
| Dipole moment | 2.2 D |

Hazards
- Occupational safety and health (OHS/OSH)
| Main hazards | Irritant |
- GHS labelling
| Pictograms | (GHS07: Exclamation mark) |
| Signal word | Warning |
| Hazard statements | H315, H319, H335 |
| Precautionary statements | P261, P264, P271, P280, P302+P352, P304+P340, P305+P351+P338, P312, P321, P332+P313, P337+P313, P362, P403+P233, P405, P501 |
| Flash point | 106 °C (223 °F; 379 K) |
| Safety data sheet (SDS) | External MSDS |

Related compounds
| Related compounds | cinnoline, quinoxaline, phthalazine |
- Except where otherwise noted, data are given for materials in their standard state (at 25 °C [77 °F], 100 kPa). verify (what is ?) Infobox references

Quinazoline is an organic compound with the formula C_{8}H_{6}N_{2}. It is an aromatic heterocycle with a bicyclic structure consisting of two fused six-membered aromatic rings, a benzene ring and a pyrimidine ring. It is a light yellow crystalline solid that is soluble in water. Also known as 1,3-diazanaphthalene, quinazoline received its name from being an aza derivative of quinoline. Though the parent quinazoline molecule is rarely mentioned by itself in technical literature, substituted derivatives have been synthesized for medicinal purposes such as antimalarial and anticancer agents. Quinazoline is a planar molecule. It is isomeric with the other diazanaphthalenes of the benzodiazine subgroup: cinnoline, quinoxaline, and phthalazine. Over 200 biologically active quinazoline and quinoline alkaloids are identified.

== Synthesis ==
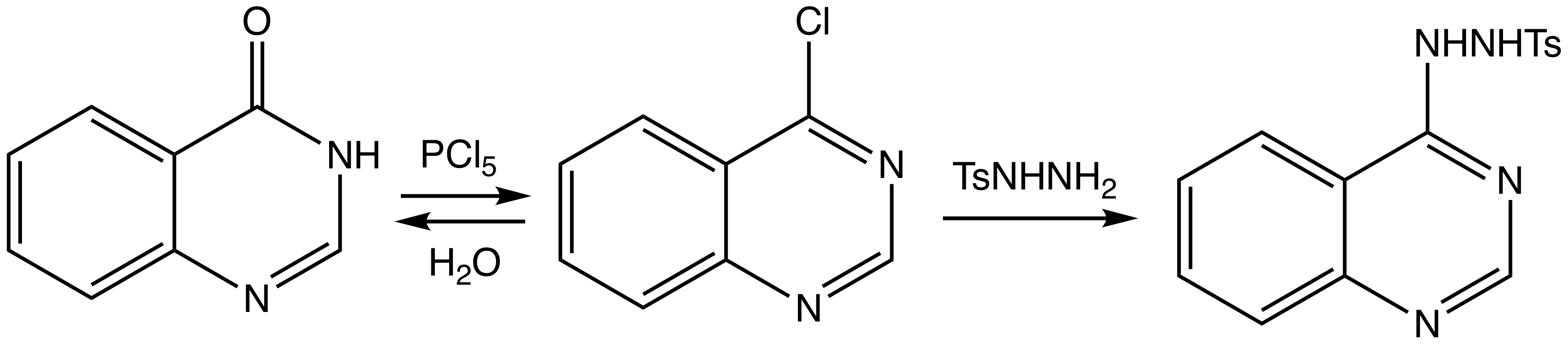
Preparation of 4-chloroquinazoline and its tosylhydrazide.

The synthesis of quinazoline was first reported in 1895 by August Bischler and Lang through the decarboxylation of the 2-carboxy derivative (quinazoline-2-carboxylic acid). In 1903, Siegmund Gabriel reported the synthesis of the parent quinazoline from o-nitrobenzylamine, which was reduced with hydrogen iodide and red phosphorus to 2-aminobenzylamine. The reduced intermediate condenses with formic acid to yield dihydroquinazoline, which was oxidized to quinazoline.

Methods have been reviewed. An efficient route to the parent heterocycle proceeds via the 4-chloro derivative to the tosylhydrazide, which is removed by base.

== Reactions ==
=== Hydration and addition reactions ===
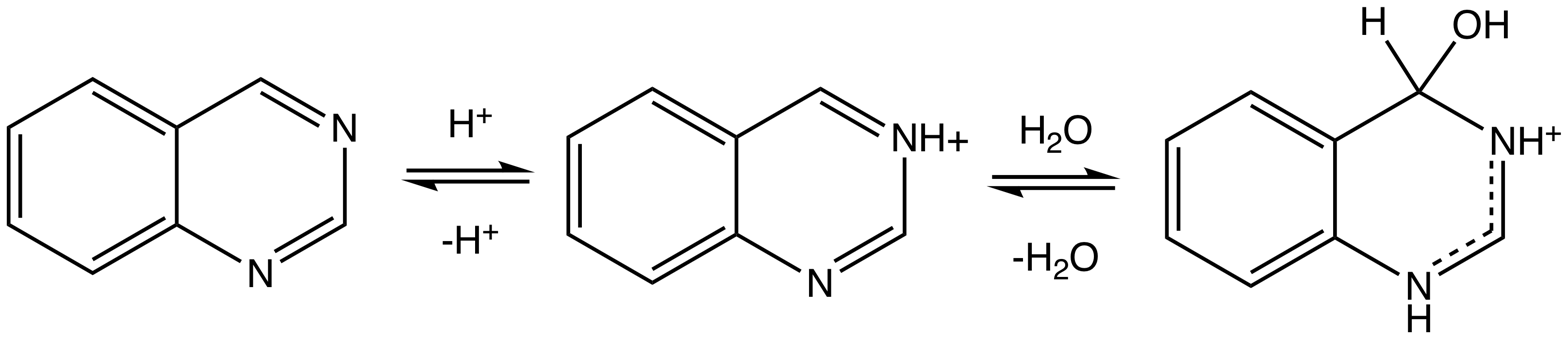
Hydration of quinazolinium.

Quinazoline protonates (and methylates) at N3. Protonation induces hydration. Many mildly acidic substrates add across the C=N3 bond, these include hydrogen cyanide, sodium bisulfite, and methyl ketones.

=== Hydrolysis ===
In warm solution, quinazoline hydrolyzes under acidic and alkaline conditions to 2-aminobenzaldehyde (or the products of its self-condensation) and formic acid and ammonia/ammonium.

=== Electrophilic and nucleophilic substitution ===
The pyrimidine ring resists electrophilic substitution, although the 4-position is more reactive than the 2-position. In comparison, the benzene ring is more susceptible to electrophilic substitution. The ring position order of reactivity is 8 > 6 > 5 > 7. 2- and 4-halo derivatives of quinazoline undergo displacement by nucleophiles, such as piperidine.

== Biological and pharmacological significance ==
=== Gefitinib ===
In May 2003, the U.S. Food and Drug Administration (FDA) approved the quinazoline gefitinib. The drug, produced by AstraZeneca, is an inhibitor of the protein kinase of epidermal growth factor receptor (EGFR). It binds to the ATP-binding site of EGFR, thus inactivating the anti-apoptotic Ras signal transduction cascade preventing further growth of cancer cells.

=== Lapatinib ===
In March 2007, GlaxoSmithKline's drug lapatinib was approved by the U.S. FDA to treat advanced-stage or metastatic breast cancer in combination with Roche's capecitabine. Lapatinib eliminates the growth of breast cancer stem cells that cause tumor growth. The binding of lapatinib to the ATP-binding site in the EGFR and human epidermal growth factor receptor 2 (HER2) protein kinase domains inhibits signal mechanism activation (through reversible, competitive inhibition).

=== Erlotinib ===
In May 2013, erlotinib, a drug manufactured by Astellas, was approved by the U.S. FDA to treat NSCLC patients with tumors caused by mutations of EGFR. The binding of erlotinib to the ATP-binding sites of the EGFR receptors prevents EGFR from producing phosphotyrosine residues (due to competitive inhibition), thus rendering the receptor incapable of generating signal cascades to promote cell growth.

=== Afatinib ===
In July 2013, the U.S. FDA approved afatinib, a drug developed by Boehringer Ingelheim, as an irreversible, competitive inhibitor of HER2 and EGFR kinases. While afatinib demonstrates a similar mechanism to laptinib in which it acts as an irreversible HER2 and EGFR inhibitor, afatinib has also shown activity against tyrosine kinases that have become resistant to gefinitib and erlotinib.

Quinazoline-containing drugs

Gefitinib for treatment of non-small-cell lung carcinoma.

Lapatinib for treatment of advanced-stage or metastatic breast cancer.

Erlotinib, an anti-tumor agent.

Afatinib for treatment of cancers resistant to gefinitib and erlotinib.

== See also ==
- Quinazolinone
- Niementowski quinazoline synthesis
