= Hexaprenyl diphosphate synthase (geranylgeranyl-diphosphate specific) =

Identifiers
- EC no.: 2.5.1.82

Databases
- IntEnz: IntEnz view
- BRENDA: BRENDA entry
- ExPASy: NiceZyme view
- KEGG: KEGG entry
- MetaCyc: metabolic pathway
- PRIAM: profile
- PDB structures: RCSB PDB PDBe PDBsum
Search
- PMC: articles
- PubMed: articles
- NCBI: proteins

Hexaprenyl diphosphate synthase (geranylgeranyl-diphosphate specific) (EC 2.5.1.82, HexPS, (all-E) hexaprenyl diphosphate synthase, (all-trans) hexaprenyl diphosphate synthase, hexaprenyl pyrophosphate synthase, HexPPs, hexaprenyl diphosphate synthase) is an enzyme with systematic name geranylgeranyl-diphosphate:isopentenyl-diphosphate transferase (adding 2 isopentenyl units). This enzyme catalyses the following chemical reaction

geranylgeranyl diphosphate + 2 isopentenyl diphosphate $\rightleftharpoons$ 2 diphosphate + all-trans-hexaprenyl diphosphate

The enzyme prefers geranylgeranyl diphosphate to farnesyl diphosphate as an allylic substrate.
