= Hexaprenyl-diphosphate synthase ((2E,6E)-farnesyl-diphosphate specific) =

Class of enzymes

Identifiers
- EC no.: 2.5.1.83

Databases
- IntEnz: IntEnz view
- BRENDA: BRENDA entry
- ExPASy: NiceZyme view
- KEGG: KEGG entry
- MetaCyc: metabolic pathway
- PRIAM: profile
- PDB structures: RCSB PDB PDBe PDBsum
Search
- PMC: articles
- PubMed: articles
- NCBI: proteins

Hexaprenyl-diphosphate synthase ((2E,6E)-farnesyl-diphosphate specific) (EC 2.5.1.83, HexPS, hexaprenyl pyrophosphate synthetase, hexaprenyl diphosphate synthase) is an enzyme with systematic name (2E,6E)-farnesyl-diphosphate:isopentenyl-diphosphate farnesyltranstransferase (adding 3 isopentenyl units). This enzyme catalyses the following chemical reaction

(2E,6E)-farnesyl diphosphate + 3 isopentenyl diphosphate $\rightleftharpoons$ 3 diphosphate + all-trans-hexaprenyl diphosphate

The enzyme prefers farnesyl diphosphate to geranylgeranyl diphosphate as an allylic substrate.
