= Quinoxaline =

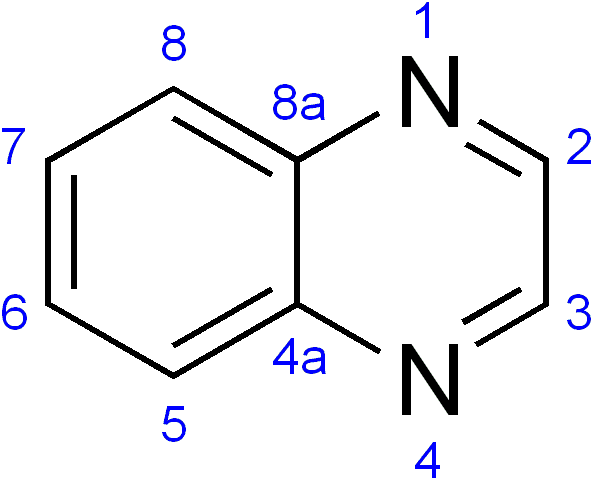
- Skeletal formula of quinoxaline

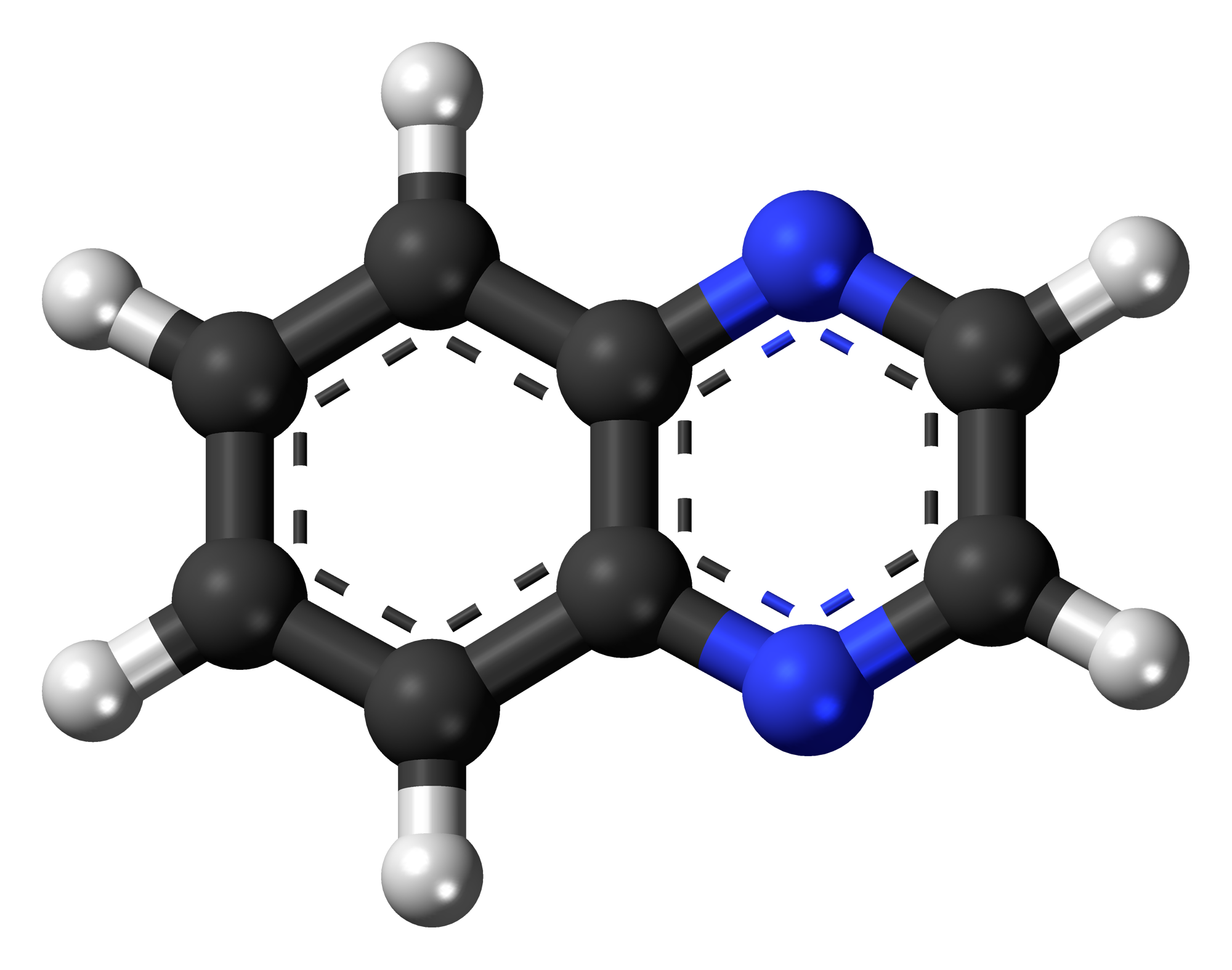
C=black, H=white, N=blue
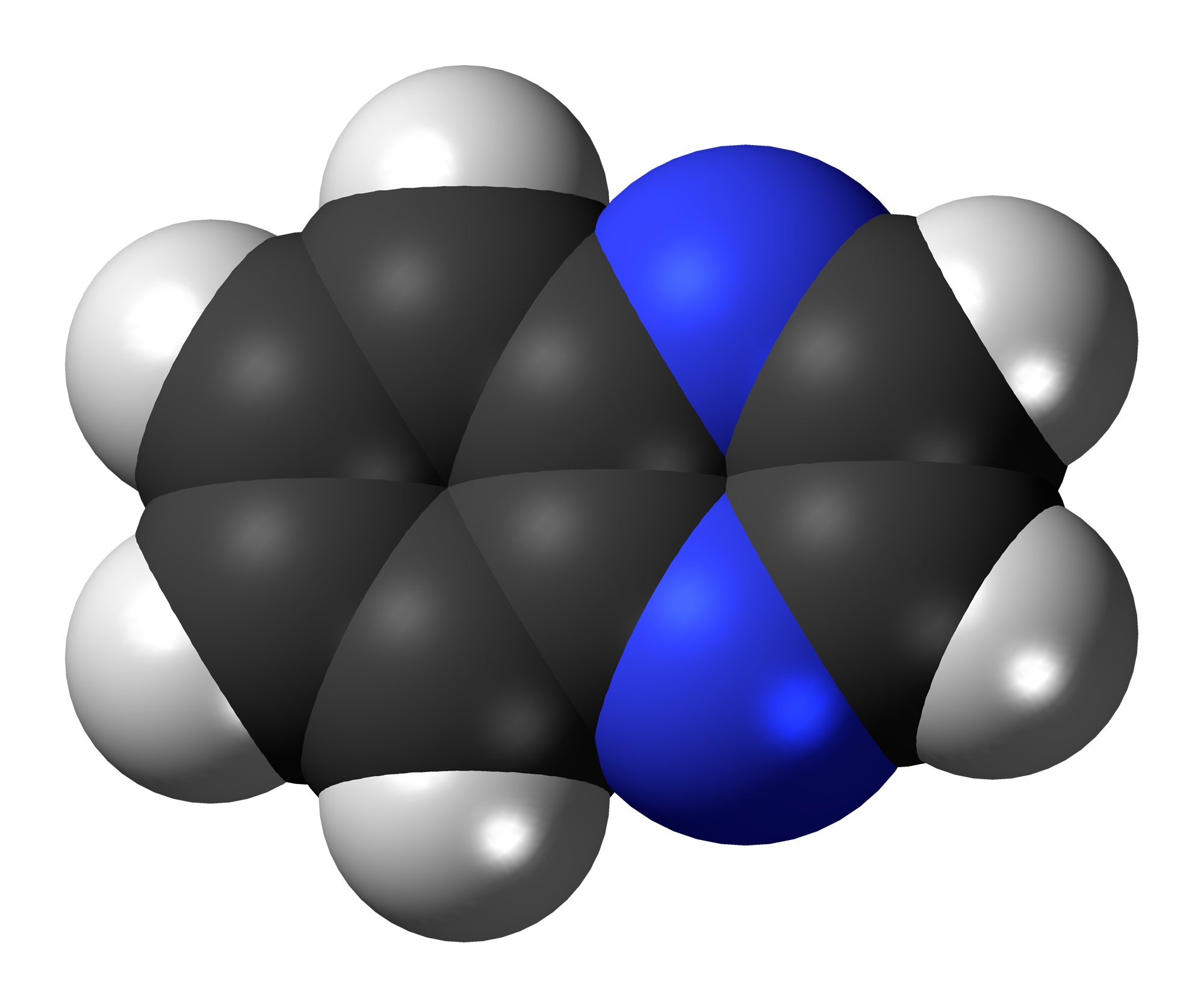
C=black, H=white, N=blue

Names
- Preferred IUPAC name Quinoxaline
- Other names Benzo[b]pyrazine, Benzopyrazine, Benzoparadiazine, 1,4-Benzodiazine, Phenopiazine, Phenpiazine, Quinazine, Chinoxalin

Identifiers
CAS Number	91-19-0
3D model (JSmol)	Interactive image
ChEBI	CHEBI:36616
ChEMBL	ChEMBL39444
ChemSpider	21106470
ECHA InfoCard	100.001.862
EC Number	202-047-4
KEGG	C18575
PubChem CID	7045
UNII	QM4AR6M6T8
CompTox Dashboard (EPA)	DTXSID6049432
- InChI: InChI=1S/C8H6N2/c1-2-4-8-7(3-1)9-5-6-10-8/h1-6H Key: XSCHRSMBECNVNS-UHFFFAOYSA-N; InChI=1/C8H6N2/c1-2-4-8-7(3-1)9-5-6-10-8/h1-6H Key: XSCHRSMBECNVNS-UHFFFAOYAS
- SMILES: c1cccc2nccnc12

Properties
Chemical formula	C_{8}H_{6}N_{2}
Molar mass	130.150 g·mol^{−1}
Melting point	29-32 °C
Boiling point	220 to 223 °C (428 to 433 °F; 493 to 496 K)
Acidity (pK_{a})	0.60

Hazards
- GHS labelling
Pictograms	(GHS07: Exclamation mark)
Signal word	Warning
Hazard statements	H315, H319, H335
Precautionary statements	P261, P264, P271, P280, P302+P352, P304+P340, P305+P351+P338, P312, P321, P332+P313, P337+P313, P362, P403+P233, P405, P501
- Except where otherwise noted, data are given for materials in their standard state (at 25 °C [77 °F], 100 kPa). verify (what is ?) Infobox references

A quinoxaline, also called a benzopyrazine, in organic chemistry, is a heterocyclic compound containing a ring complex made up of a benzene ring and a pyrazine ring. It is isomeric with other naphthyridines including quinazoline, phthalazine and cinnoline. It is a colorless oil that melts just above room temperature. Although quinoxaline itself is mainly of academic interest, quinoxaline derivatives are used as dyes, pharmaceuticals (such as varenicline), and antibiotics such as olaquindox, carbadox, echinomycin, levomycin and actinoleutin.

== Synthesis ==
They can be formed by condensing ortho-diamines with 1,2-diketones. The parent substance of the group, quinoxaline, results when glyoxal is condensed with 1,2-diaminobenzene. Substituted derivatives arise when α-ketonic acids, α-chlorketones, α-aldehyde alcohols and α-ketone alcohols are used in place of diketones. Quinoxaline and its analogues may also be formed by reduction of amino acids substituted 1,5-difluoro-2,4-dinitrobenzene (DFDNB):

One study used 2-iodoxybenzoic acid (IBX) as a catalyst in the reaction of benzil with 1,2-diaminobenzene:

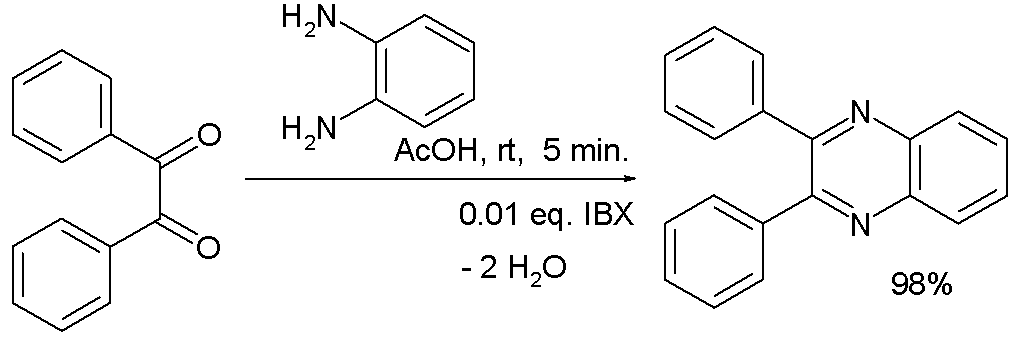
Quinoxaline Synthesis

== Uses ==
The antitumoral properties of quinoxaline compounds have been of interest. Recently, quinoxaline and its analogs have been investigated as ligands.
