= All-trans-decaprenyl-diphosphate synthase =

Class of enzymes

Identifiers
- EC no.: 2.5.1.91

Databases
- IntEnz: IntEnz view
- BRENDA: BRENDA entry
- ExPASy: NiceZyme view
- KEGG: KEGG entry
- MetaCyc: metabolic pathway
- PRIAM: profile
- PDB structures: RCSB PDB PDBe PDBsum
Search
- PMC: articles
- PubMed: articles
- NCBI: proteins

All-trans-decaprenyl-diphosphate synthase (EC 2.5.1.91, decaprenyl-diphosphate synthase, decaprenyl pyrophosphate synthetase, polyprenylpyrophosphate synthetase, terpenoidallyltransferase, terpenyl pyrophosphate synthetase, trans-prenyltransferase) is an enzyme with systematic name (2E,6E)-farnesyl-diphosphate:isopentenyl-diphosphate farnesyltranstransferase (adding 7 isopentenyl units). This enzyme catalyses the following chemical reaction

(2E,6E)-farnesyl diphosphate + 7 isopentenyl diphosphate $\rightleftharpoons$ 7 diphosphate + all-trans-decaprenyl diphosphate

This enzyme catalyses the condensation reactions resulting in the formation of all-trans-decaprenyl diphosphate.
