= All-trans-octaprenyl-diphosphate synthase =

Class of enzymes

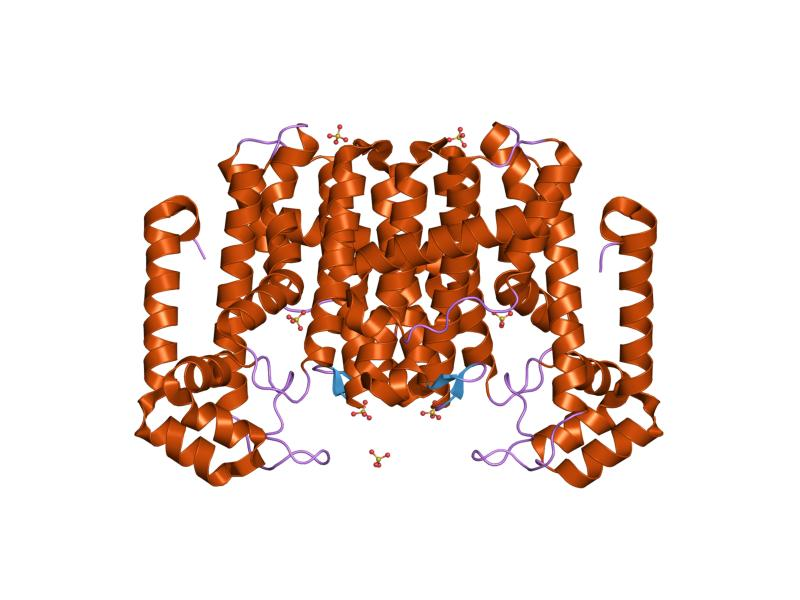

Identifiers
- EC no.: 2.5.1.90

Databases
- IntEnz: IntEnz view
- BRENDA: BRENDA entry
- ExPASy: NiceZyme view
- KEGG: KEGG entry
- MetaCyc: metabolic pathway
- PRIAM: profile
- PDB structures: RCSB PDB PDBe PDBsum
Search
- PMC: articles
- PubMed: articles
- NCBI: proteins

All-trans-octaprenyl-diphosphate synthase (EC 2.5.1.90, octaprenyl-diphosphate synthase, octaprenyl pyrophosphate synthetase, polyprenylpyrophosphate synthetase, terpenoidallyltransferase, terpenyl pyrophosphate synthetase, trans-heptaprenyltranstransferase, trans-prenyltransferase) is an enzyme with systematic name (2E,6E)-farnesyl-diphosphate:isopentenyl-diphosphate farnesyltranstransferase (adding 5 isopentenyl units). This enzyme catalyses the following chemical reaction

(2E,6E)-farnesyl diphosphate + 5 isopentenyl diphosphate $\rightleftharpoons$ 5 diphosphate + all-trans-octaprenyl diphosphate

This enzyme catalyses the condensation reactions resulting in the formation of all-trans-octaprenyl diphosphate.
