= Doebner–Miller reaction =

Chemical reaction

The Doebner–Miller reaction is the organic reaction of an aniline with α,β-unsaturated carbonyl compounds to form quinolines.

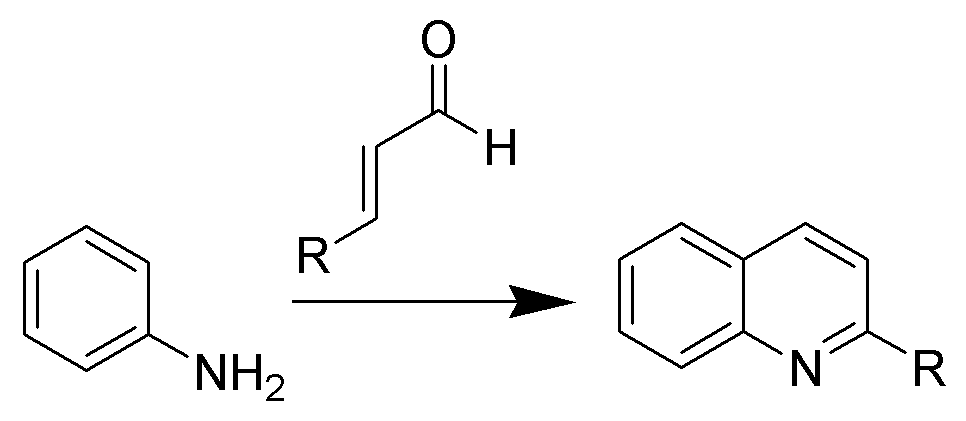
Scheme 1. The Doebner-Miller reaction

This reaction is also known as the Skraup-Doebner-Von Miller quinoline synthesis, and is named after the Czech chemist Zdenko Hans Skraup (1850–1910), and the Germans Oscar Döbner (Doebner) (1850–1907) and Wilhelm von Miller (1848–1899). When the α,β-unsaturated carbonyl compound is prepared in situ from two carbonyl compounds (via an Aldol condensation), the reaction is known as the Beyer method for quinolines.

The reaction is catalyzed by Lewis acids such as tin tetrachloride and scandium(III) triflate and Brønsted acids such as p-toluenesulfonic acid, perchloric acid, amberlite and iodine.

== Reaction mechanism ==
The reaction mechanism for this reaction and the related Skraup synthesis is a matter of debate. A 2006 study proposes a fragmentation-recombination mechanism based on carbon isotope scrambling experiments. In this study 4-isopropylaniline 1 is reacted with a mixture (50:50)of ordinary pulegone and the ^{13}C-enriched isomer 2 and the reaction mechanism is outlined in scheme 2 with the labeled carbon identified with a red dot. The first step is a nucleophilic conjugate addition of the amine with the enol to the amine ketone 3 in a reversible reaction. This intermediate then fragments to the imine 4a and the saturated cyclohexanone 4b in a non-reversible reaction and both fragments recombine in a condensation reaction to the conjugated imine 5. In the next step 5 reacts with a second aniline molecule in a nucleophilic conjugate addition to imine 6 and subsequent electrophilic addition and proton transfer to leads to 7. elimination of one aniline molecule through 8 and rearomatization leads to final product 9. Because α-amino protons are not available in this model compound the reaction is not taken to the fully fledged quinoline.

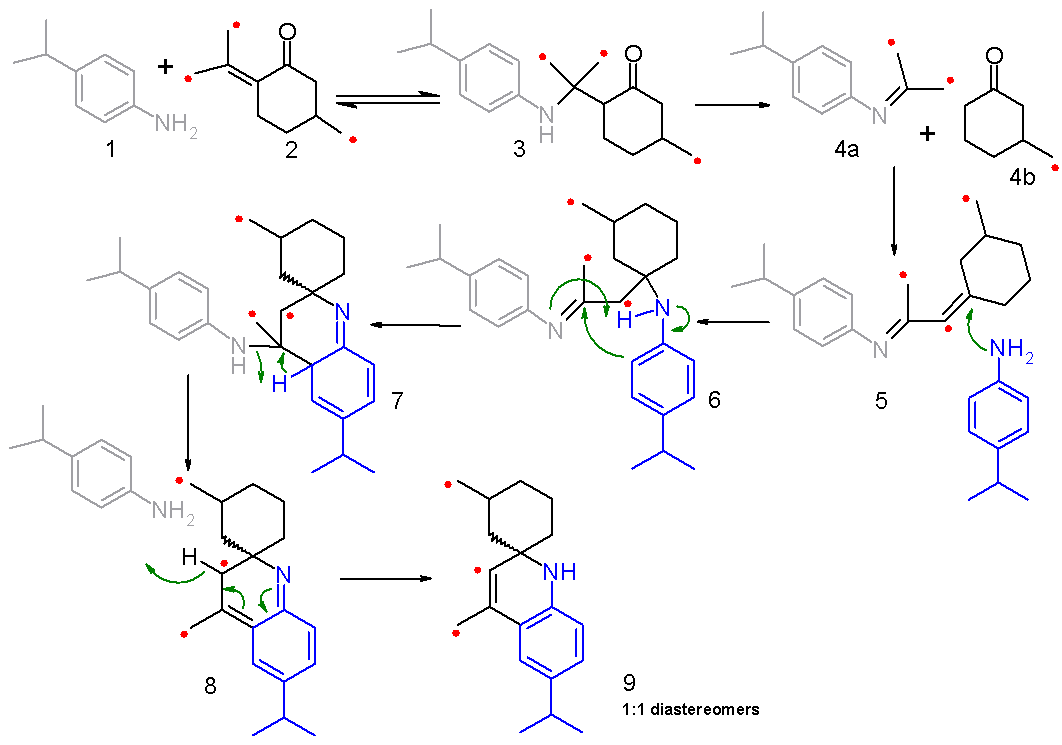
Scheme 2. Doebner-Miller reaction mechanism

The fragmentation to 4a and 4b is key to this mechanism because it explains the isotope scrambling results. In the reaction only half the pulegone reactant (2) is labeled and on recombining a labeled imine fragment can react with another labeled ketone fragment or an unlabeled fragment and likewise a labeled ketone fragment can react with a labeled or unlabeled imine fragment. The resulting product distribution is confirmed by mass spectrometry of the final product 9.

== See also ==
- Combes quinoline synthesis
- Doebner reaction
- Gould–Jacobs reaction
- Knorr quinoline synthesis
- Skraup synthesis
