= Povarov reaction =

Chemical reaction

The Povarov reaction is an organic reaction described as a formal cycloaddition between an aromatic imine and an alkene. The imine in this organic reaction is a condensation reaction product from an aniline type compound and a benzaldehyde type compound. The alkene must be electron rich which means that functional groups attached to the alkene must be able to donate electrons. Such alkenes are enol ethers and enamines. The reaction product in the original Povarov reaction is a quinoline. Because the reactions can be carried out with the three components premixed in one reactor it is an example of a multi-component reaction.

== Reaction mechanism ==
The reaction mechanism for the Povarov reaction to the quinoline is outlined in Scheme 1. In step one aniline and benzaldehyde react to the Schiff base in a condensation reaction. The Povarov reaction requires a Lewis acid such as boron trifluoride to activate the imine for an electrophilic addition of the activated alkene. This reaction step forms an oxonium ion which then reacts with the aromatic ring in a classical electrophilic aromatic substitution. Two additional elimination reactions create the quinoline ring structure.

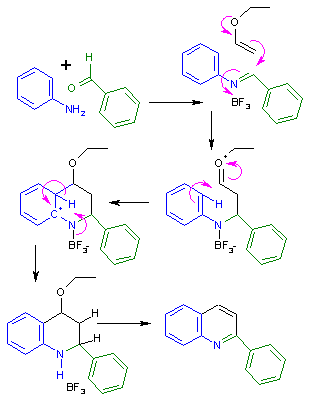
Scheme 1. The Povarov reaction

The reaction is also classified as a subset of aza Diels-Alder reactions; however, it occurs by a step-wise rather than concerted mechanism.

== Examples ==
The reaction depicted in Scheme 2 illustrates the Povarov reaction with an imine and an enamine in the presence of yttrium triflate as the Lewis acid. This reaction is regioselective because the iminium ion preferentially attacks the nitro ortho position and not the para position. The nitro group is a meta directing substituent but since this position is blocked, the most electron rich ring position is now ortho and not para. The reaction is also stereoselective because the enamine addition occurs with a diastereomeric preference for trans addition without formation of the cis isomer. This is in contrast to traditional Diels–Alder reactions, which are stereospecific based on the alkene geometry.

Scheme 2. regio- and diastereoselective Povarov reaction

In 2013, Doyle and coworkers reported a Povarov-type, formal [4+2]-cycloaddition reaction between donor-acceptor cyclopropenes and imines (Scheme 3). In the first step, a dirhodium catalyst effects diazo decomposition from silyl enol ether diazo compound to yield a donor/acceptor cyclopropene. The donor/acceptor cyclopropene is then reacted with an aryl imine under scandium(III) triflate catalyzed conditions to yield cyclopropane-fused tetrahydroquinolines in good yields and diastereoselectivities. Treatment of these compounds with TBAF invokes a ring-expansion that provides the corresponding benzazepines.

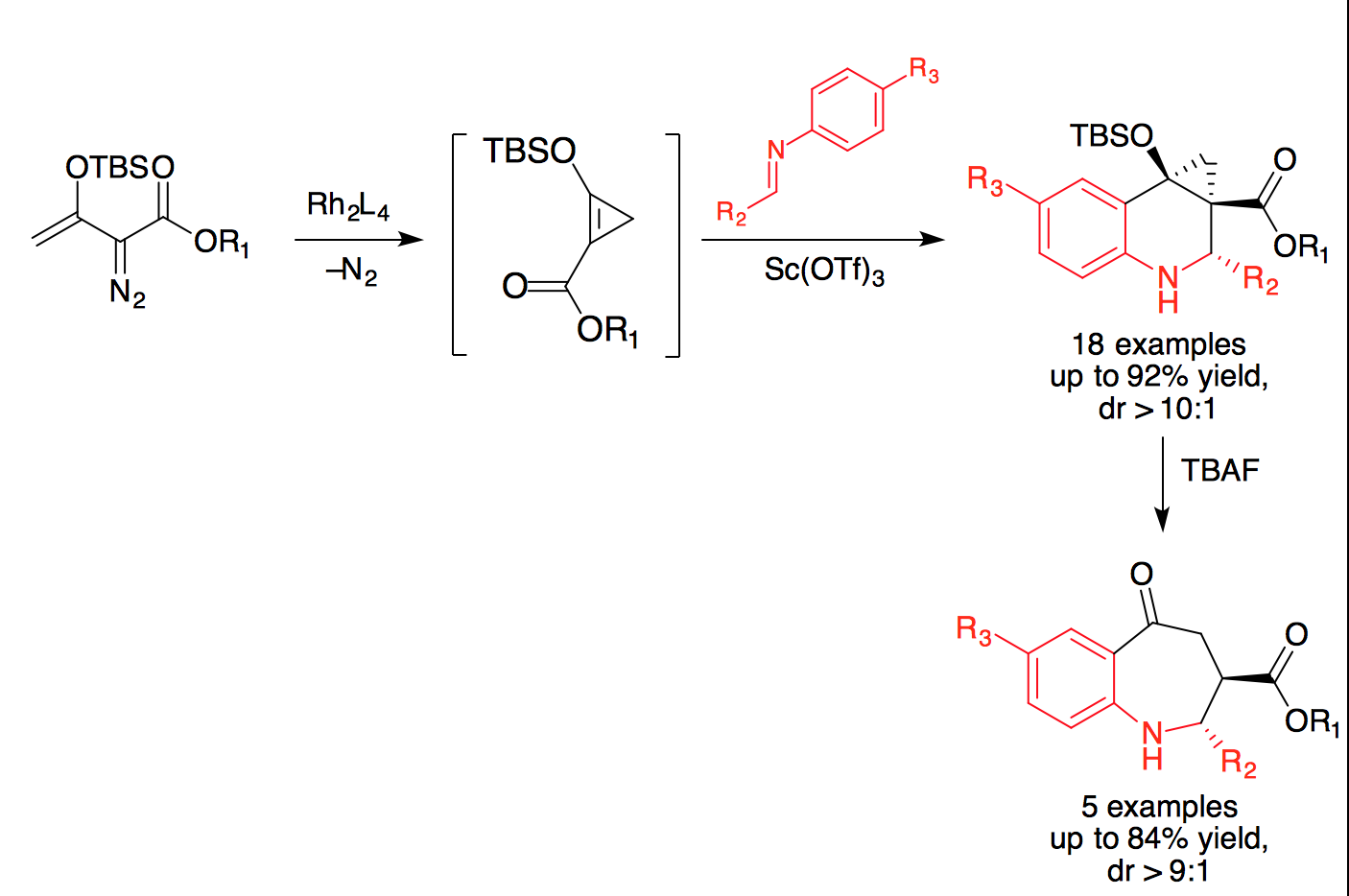
Donor-acceptor cyclopropene formation and subsequent [4+2] cycloaddition to yield cyclopropane-fused tetrahydroquinolines. Subsequent treatment with TBAF opens the cyclopropane ring to give benzazepines.

== Variations ==
One variation of the Povarov reaction is a four component reaction. Whereas in the traditional Povarov reaction the intermediate carbocation gives an intramolecular reaction with the aryl group, this intermediate can also be terminated by an additional nucleophile such as an alcohol. Scheme 4 depicts this 4 component reaction with the ethyl ester of glyoxylic acid, 3,4-dihydro-2H-pyran, aniline and ethanol with lewis acid scandium(III) triflate and molecular sieves.

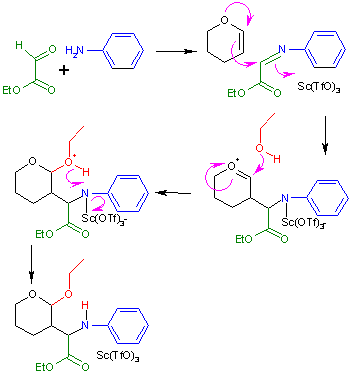
Scheme 4 Four component Povarov reaction. In order to clarify the role of the lewis acid, a solid scandium nitrogen bond is drawn. Reaction conditions 2 days in acetonitrile at room temperature

== See also ==
- Doebner reaction
- Doebner-Miller reaction
- Grieco three-component condensation
