= C10H9N =

The molecular formula C_{10}H_{9}N (molar mass: 143.19 g/mol, exact mass: 143.0735 u) may refer to:

- Benzazepine
- Lepidine, or 4-methylquinoline
- 1-Naphthylamine
- 2-Naphthylamine
- Phenylpyrroles
- Quinaldine
