= Conrad–Limpach synthesis =

Chemical reaction

The Conrad–Limpach synthesis is the condensation of anilines (1) with β-ketoesters (2) to form 4-hydroxyquinolines (4) via a Schiff base (3). The overall reaction type is a combination of both an addition reaction as well as a rearrangement reaction. This reaction was discovered by Max Conrad (1848–1920) and Leonhard Limpach (1852–1933) in 1887 while they were studying the synthesis of quinoline derivatives.

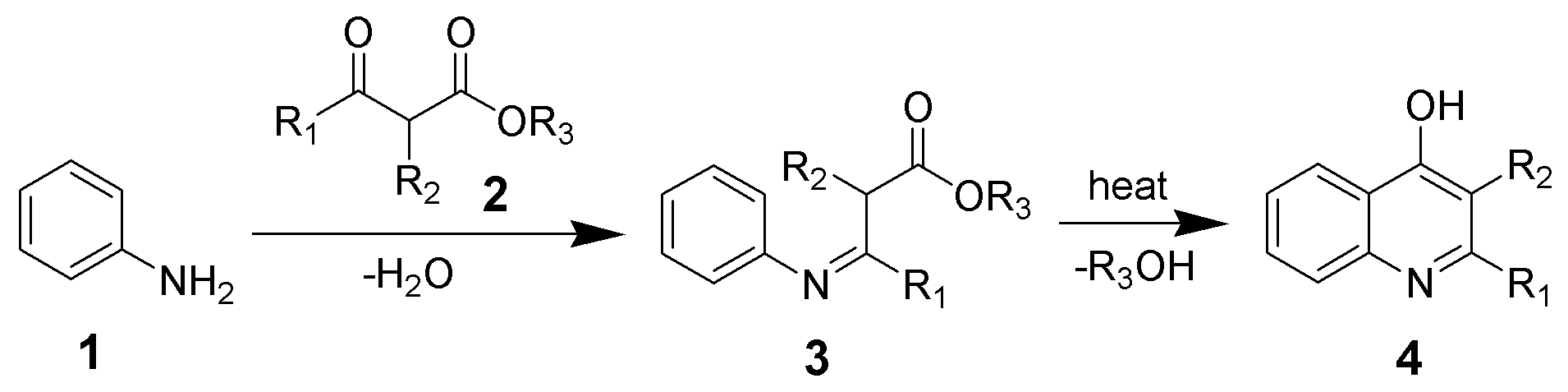
The Conrad-Limpach synthesis

== Reaction mechanism ==
The mechanism begins with an attack of aniline on the keto group of the β-ketoester to form a tetrahedral intermediate. The newly formed oxide is then twice protonated to form the Schiff base, which then undergoes keto-enol tautomerization before an electrocyclic ring closing. The mechanism concludes with the removal of an alcohol, a series of proton transfers, and a keto/enol tautomerization to form a 4-hydroxyquinoline, the final product of the Conrad–Limpach synthesis.

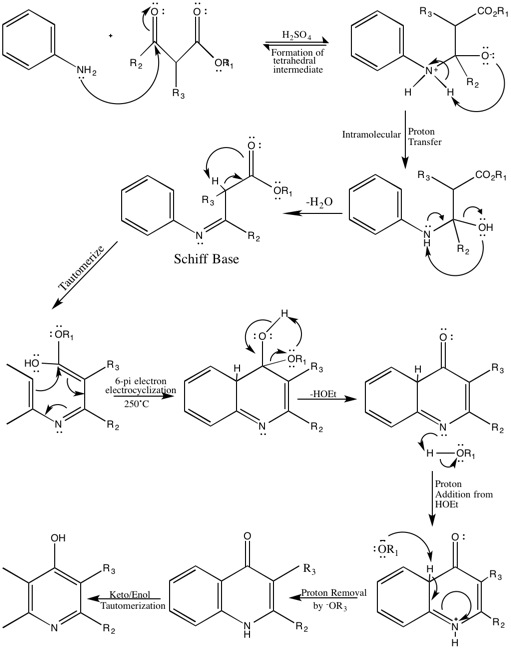

Perhaps the most important step (and the rate-determining step) in the reaction mechanism is the annulation of the molecule via an electrocyclic ring closing. For this step, the Schiff base must be heated to ~250 °C for the ring closure to occur. Furthermore, the type of solvent used is very important to ensuring high yields of the 4-hydroxyquinoline product. In the early work, the cyclization was accomplished by heating the Schiff base without a solvent and the yields were very moderate (below 30%). Limpach reported many years later that the yields in the cyclization were raised to 95% in many cases when an inert solvent, such as mineral oil, was used for the reaction.

The Conrad-Limpach reaction mechanism also involves multiple keto-enol tautomerizations, all of which are catalyzed through the use of a strong acid, often HCl or H_{2}SO_{4}.

With much of the literature on the synthesis of quinolines, there is some discrepancy on whether a substituted 4-hydroxyquinoline or a substituted 4-quinolone is the final product of the Conrad–Limpach synthesis. Although the reaction product is often shown as a hydroxyquinoline (the enol form), it is believed that the quinolone (keto form) predominates. For the purposes of this page and based on the reaction mechanism as it is shown in Name Reactions: A Collection of Detailed Mechanisms and Synthetic Applications by Ji Jack Li, the product is a hydroxyquinoline.

== Regioselectivity of β-ketoester: Knorr variation ==
In the reaction of aniline with a β-ketoester, there are two possible sites of attack for the aniline nitrogen atom: the very reactive keto group, or the less reactive ester group. When Conrad and Limpach first observed this reaction in 1887, it was run at room temperature, and gave high yields of β-aminoacrylate: the kinetic product. The reaction then continued to give the final product of 4-hydroxyquinoline. However, Ludwig Knorr observed that under higher temperatures (approximately 140 °C) the aniline would actually attack the ester group of the β-ketoester, leading to the thermodynamically preferred β-keto acid anilide product (albeit in less than ideal yields). Continuation of this reaction using the Conrad-Limpach mechanism led to the synthesis of 2-hydroxyquinoline. The initial synthesis of 2-hydroxyquinoline from a β-ketoanilide was reported in 1886 as the Knorr quinoline synthesis. Therefore, the overall reaction is sometimes called the “Conrad-Limpach-Knorr reaction”.

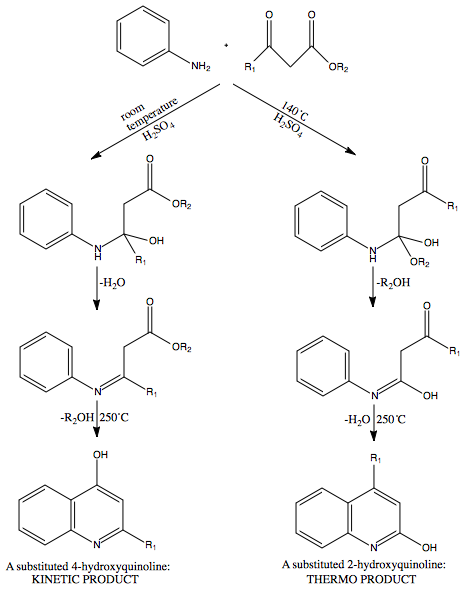

== Applications ==
The synthesis of 4-hydroxyquinolines and 4-quinolones is of great importance to a variety of fields, but most notably to the medical sciences due to their use as chemotherapeutic bactericidal drugs through their ability to kill bacteria. This mechanism involved disabling the bacterial topoisomerase II/IV enzyme (the target in most Gram-positive bacteria) or DNA gyrase (the target in Gram-negative bacteria), preventing the bacteria from unwinding their DNA and undergoing either DNA replication or transcription. The majority of drugs in clinical use are actually quinoline derivatives that belong to the subset fluoroquinolones, which have a fluorine atom attached to the central ring system, often at the C-6 or C-7 position.

There are also many non-antibacterial medical uses for 4-hydroxyquinoline. Baba et al. showed that many quinoline derivatives show promise in their anti-inflammatory effects for the treatment of arthritis, Schmidt et al. delved into the progress behind treating drug-resistant malaria using 4-hydroxyquinoline derivatives, and Lui-Zai Gang et al. studied the use of quinoline derivatives as HIV-1 integrase inhibitors.

== See also ==
- Combes quinoline synthesis
- Doebner reaction
