= Gould–Jacobs reaction =

Chemical reaction

The Gould–Jacobs reaction is an organic synthesis for the preparation of quinolines and 4‐hydroxyquinoline derivatives. The Gould–Jacobs reaction is a series of reactions. The series of reactions begins with the condensation/substitution of an aniline with alkoxy methylenemalonic ester or acyl malonic ester, producing anilidomethylenemalonic ester. Then through a 6 electron cyclization process, 4-hydroxy-3-carboalkoxyquinoline is formed, which exist mostly in the 4-oxo form. Saponification results in the formation of an acid. This step is followed by decarboxylation to give 4-hydroxyquinoline. The Gould–Jacobs reaction is effective for anilines with electron‐donating groups at the meta‐position.

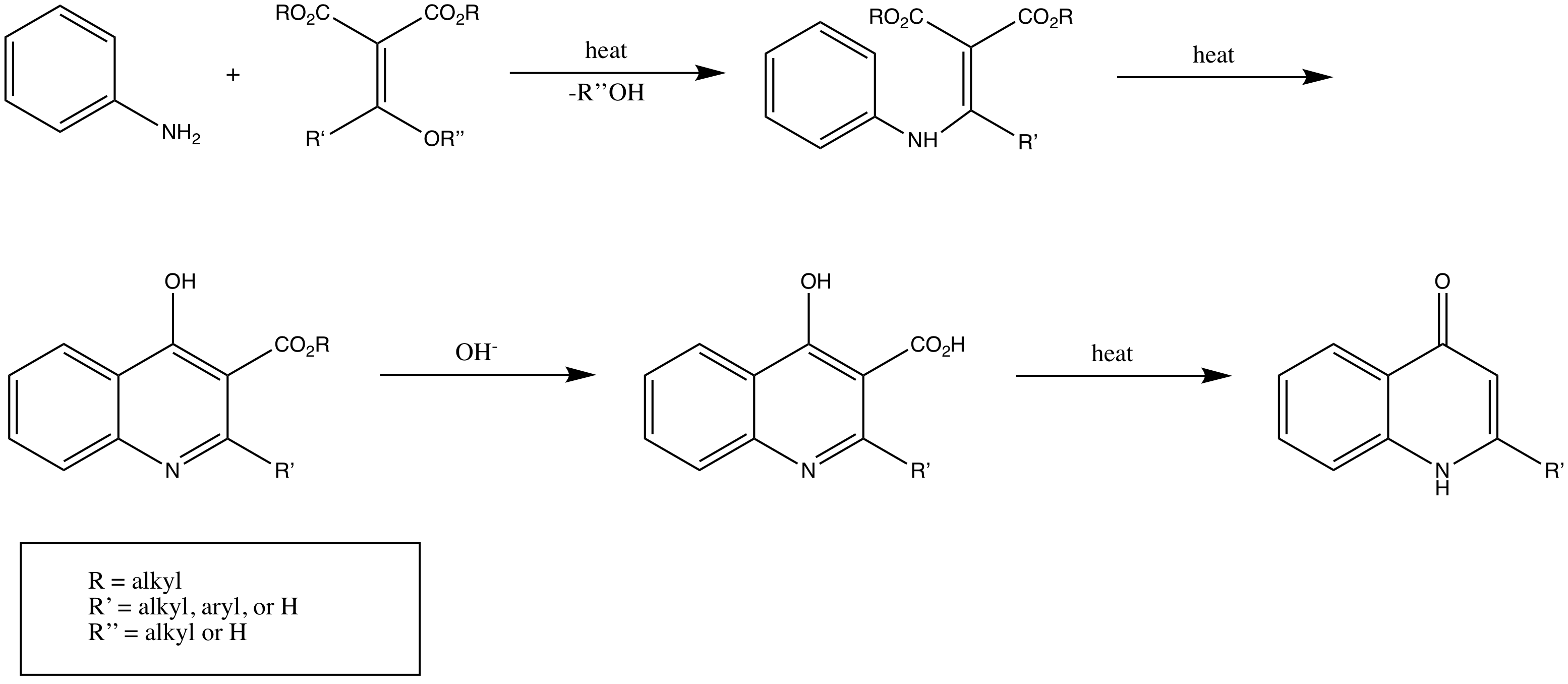
General Gould-Jacobs reaction scheme

Specifically, 4-quinolinol can be synthesized. In this reaction aniline or an aniline derivative first reacts with malonic acid derivative ethyl ethoxymethylenemalonate with substitution of the ethoxy group by nitrogen. A benzannulation takes place by application of heat to a quinoline. The ester group is hydrolysed by sodium hydroxide to the carboxylic acid and decarboxylation again by application of heat to 4-hydroxyquinoline.

Gould–Jacobs reaction

Extension of the Gould-Jacobs approach can prepare unsubstituted parent heterocycles with fused pyridine ring of Skraup type (see Skraup reaction).

Further reading:

== Mechanism ==
The mechanism for the Gould–Jacobs reaction begins with a nucleophilic attack from the amine nitrogen follows by the loss of ethanol to form the condensation product. A 6 electron cyclization reaction with the loss of another ethanol molecule forms a quinoline (ethyl 4-oxo-4,4a-dihydroquinoline-3-carboxylate). The enol form can be represented from the keto form through keto-enol tautomerism. Protonation of the nitrogen forms ethyl 4-oxo-1,4-dihydroquinoline-3-carboxylate.

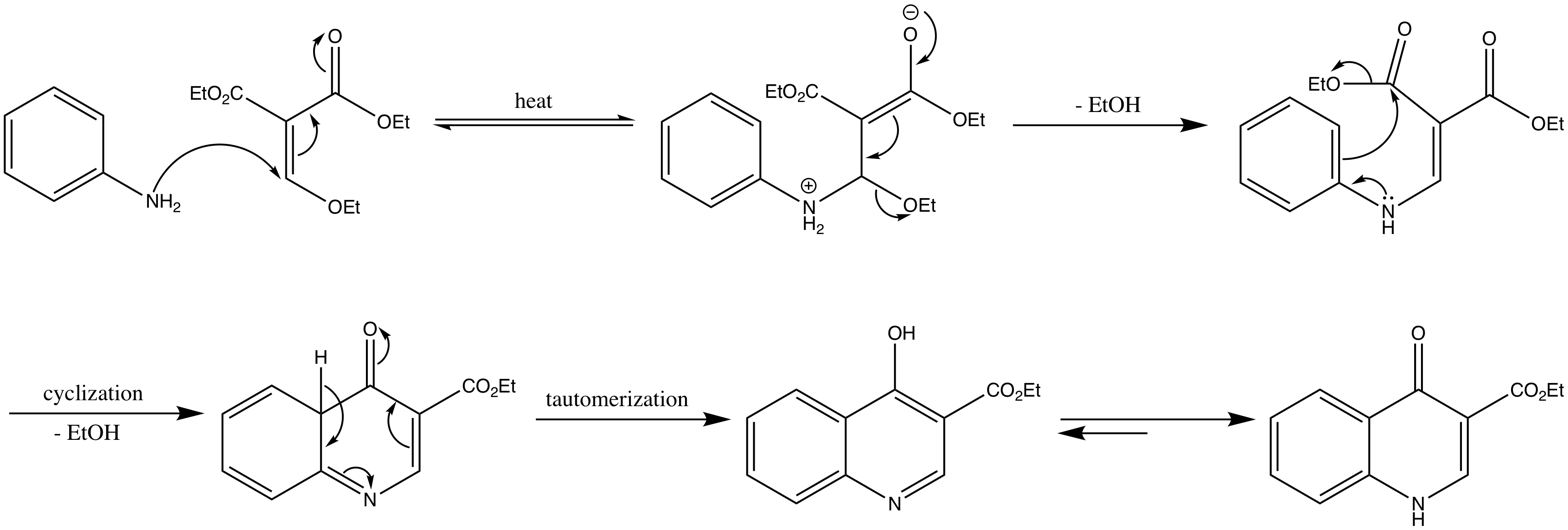
Mechanism for the Gould-Jacobs reaction

== Examples and applications ==
An example is the synthesis of 4,7-dichloroquinoline.

- Floctafenine and glafenine are a pair of fenamate NSAIDs whose syntheses rely on the Gould–Jacobs reaction.
- Several quinolone antibiotic structures such as rosoxacin, oxolinic acid, droxacin, etc.

Another example is in the synthesis of antimalarials as aminoalkylamino derivatives of 2,3-dihydrofuroquinolines

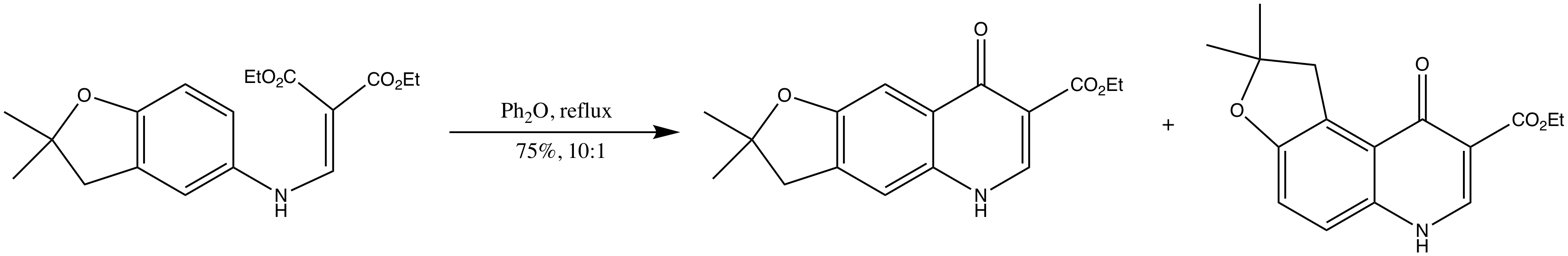
These compounds are used as antimalarials.

The Gould reaction is also used to convert 5-aminoindole to quinolines for the purpose of synthesizing pyrazolo[4,3-c]pyrrolo[3,2-f]quinolin-3-one derivatives as modified pyrazoloquinolinone analogs. These compounds have the potential to act as antagonists at central benzodiazepine receptors (BZRs) in Xenopus laevis oocytes.

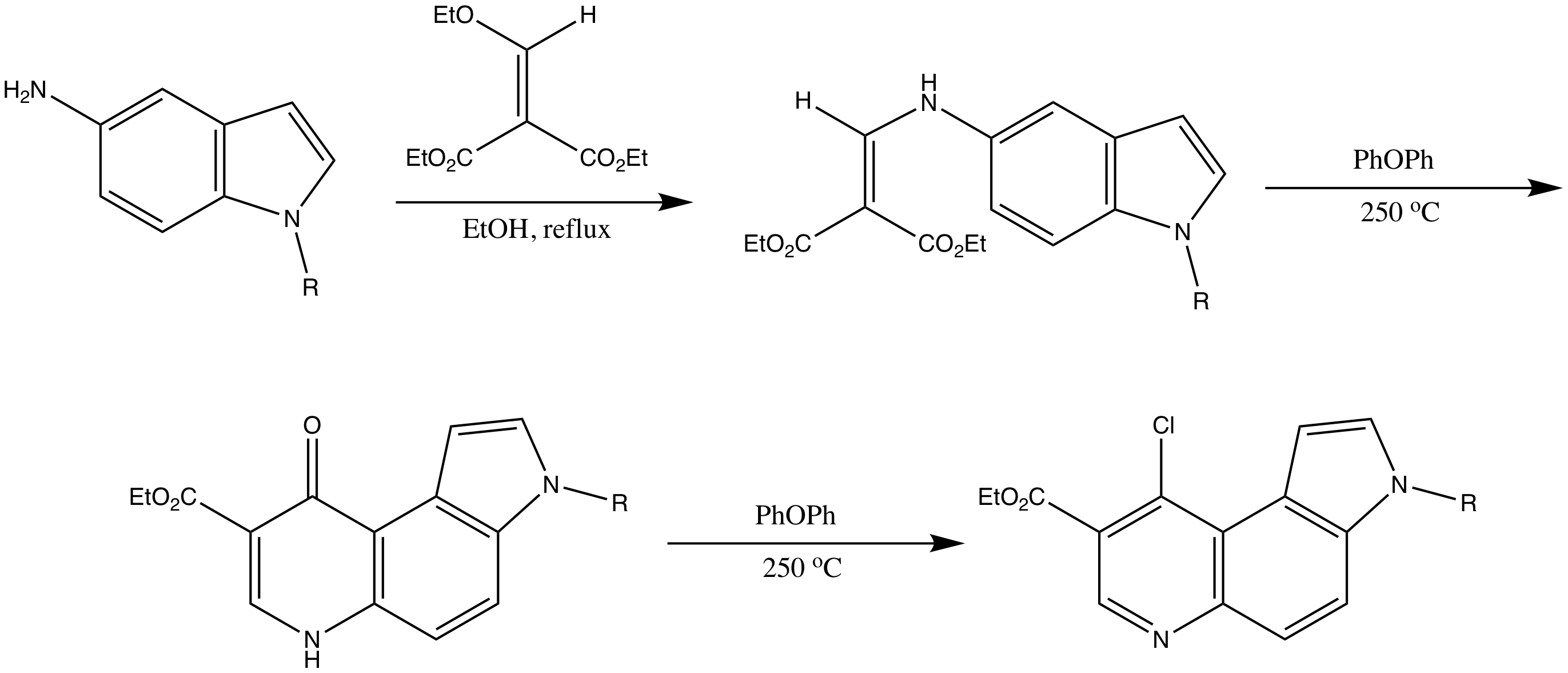
Conversion of 5-aminoindole to quinolines by the Gould–Jacobs reaction for the purpose of synthesizing pyrazolo[4,3-c]pyrrolo[3,2-f]quinolin-3-one derivatives

The Gould‐Jacobs reaction has also been used both conventionally with condensation steps and acyclic intermediated and with single step microwave irradiation to synthesize ethyl 4‐oxo‐8,10‐substituted‐4,8‐dihydropyrimido[1,2‐c]pyrrolo[3,2‐e]pyrimidine‐3‐carboxylates.

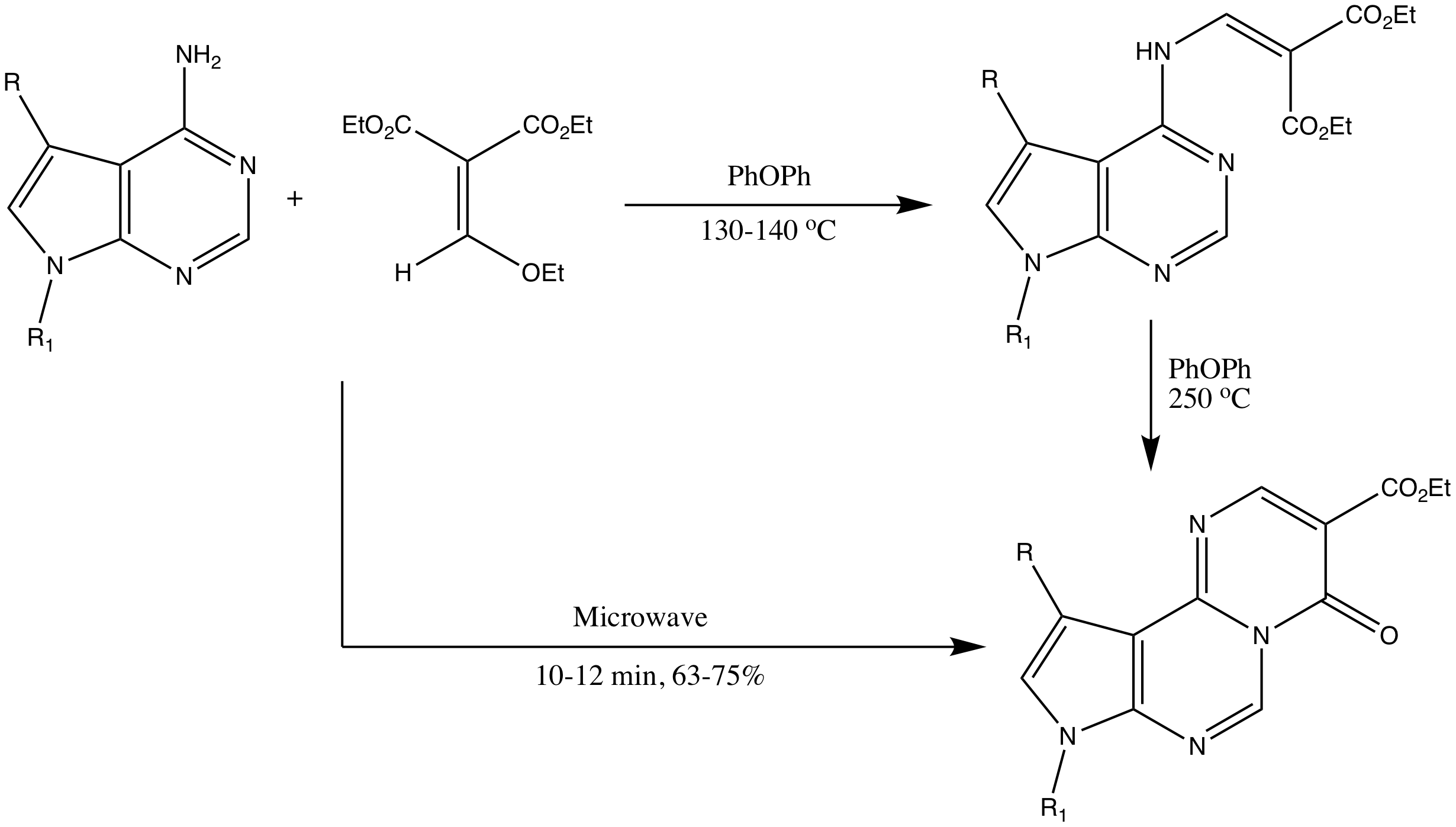
Conventional and microwave radiation approach to synthesize ethyl 4‐oxo‐8,10‐substituted‐4,8‐dihydropyrimido[1,2‐c]pyrrolo[3,2‐e]pyrimidine‐3‐carboxylates by the Gould–Jacobs reaction
