= Quinaldine =

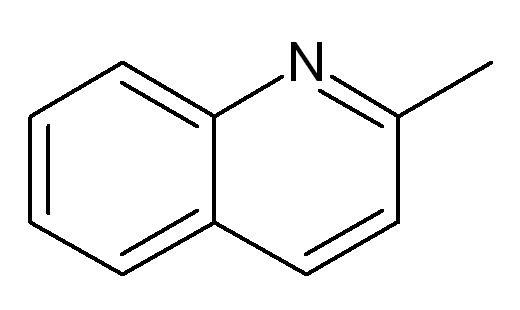

Names
- Preferred IUPAC name 2-Methylquinoline
- Other names Quinaldine, α-methylquinoline, chinaldine, khinaldin

Identifiers
CAS Number	91-63-4
3D model (JSmol)	Interactive image
ChEBI	CHEBI:132813
ChEMBL	ChEMBL194931
ChemSpider	13870160
ECHA InfoCard	100.001.896
EC Number	202-085-1
PubChem CID	7060
UNII	DVG30M0M87
CompTox Dashboard (EPA)	DTXSID3040271
- InChI: InChI=1S/C10H9N/c1-8-6-7-9-4-2-3-5-10(9)11-8/h2-7H,1H3 Key: SMUQFGGVLNAIOZ-UHFFFAOYSA-N; InChI=1/C10H9N/c1-8-6-7-9-4-2-3-5-10(9)11-8/h2-7H,1H3
- SMILES: Cc1nc2ccccc2cc1

Properties
Chemical formula	C_{10}H_{9}N
Molar mass	143.19 g/mol
Appearance	colorless oil
Density	1.058 g/cm^{3}
Melting point	−2 °C (28 °F; 271 K)
Boiling point	248 °C (478 °F; 521 K)
Solubility in water	Insoluble

Hazards
- GHS labelling
Pictograms	(GHS07: Exclamation mark)
Signal word	Warning
Hazard statements	H302, H312, H319
Precautionary statements	P264, P270, P280, P301+P312, P302+P352, P305+P351+P338, P312, P322, P330, P337+P313, P363, P501
NFPA 704 (fire diamond)	2 2 0
Flash point	79 °C (174 °F; 352 K)
- Except where otherwise noted, data are given for materials in their standard state (at 25 °C [77 °F], 100 kPa). verify (what is ?) Infobox references

Quinaldine or 2-methylquinoline is an organic compound with the formula CH_{3}C_{9}H_{6}N. It is one of the methyl derivatives of the heterocyclic compound quinoline. It is bioactive and is used in the preparation of various dyes. It is a colorless oil but commercial samples can appear colored.

== Production and reactions ==
Quinaldine is recovered from coal tar. It can be prepared from aniline and paraldehyde via Skraup synthesis or from aniline and crotonaldehyde via Doebner-von Miller variation of the Skraup reaction.

Hydrogenation of quinaldine gives 2-methyltetrahydroquinoline. This reduction can be conducted enantioselectively. Oxidation with selenium dioxide give the aldehyde 2-formylquinoline.

== Properties ==
Quinaldine has critical point at 787 K and 4.9 MPa and its refractive index is 1.8116.

== Uses ==
Quinoline Yellow is a popular dye derived from quinaldine.

Quinaldine Red, a pH indicating dye.

Quinaldine is used in manufacturing anti-malaria drugs, dyes and food colorants (e.g., Quinoline Yellows, pinacyanol). It is the precursor to the pH indicator Quinaldine Red.

Quinaldine sulfate is an anaesthetic used in fish transportation. In some Caribbean islands it is used to facilitate the collection of tropical fish from reefs.

== See also ==
- Lepidine, the isomer with the methyl group in position 4.
