= Pfitzinger =

Pfitzinger is a German surname that may refer to

- Christine Pfitzinger (born 1959), New Zealand middle-distance runner
- Pete Pfitzinger (born 1957), American long-distance runner and exercise physiologist
- Wilhelm Pfitzinger, German chemist known for the Pfitzinger reaction
