= Combes quinoline synthesis =

Organic reaction

The Combes quinoline synthesis is a chemical reaction, which was first reported by Combes in 1888. Further studies and reviews of the Combes quinoline synthesis and its variations have been published by Alyamkina et al., Bergstrom and Franklin, Born, and Johnson and Mathews.

The Combes quinoline synthesis is often used to prepare the 2,4-substituted quinoline backbone and is unique in that it uses a β-diketone substrate, which is different from other quinoline preparation methods, such as the Conrad-Limpach synthesis and the Doebner reaction.

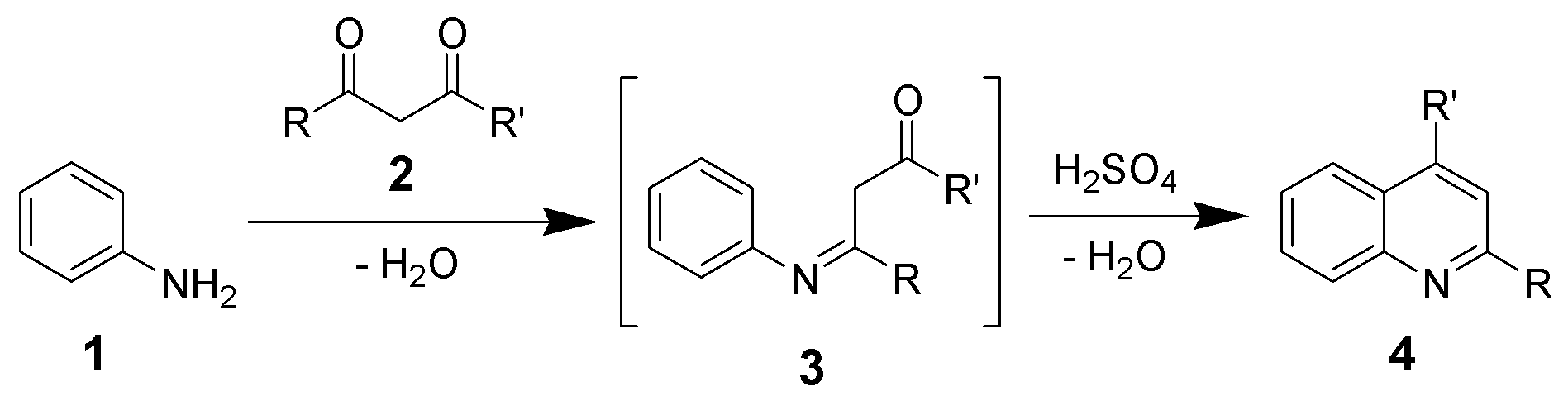
The Combes quinoline synthesis

It involves the condensation of unsubstituted anilines (1) with β-diketones (2) to form substituted quinolines (4) after an acid-catalyzed ring closure of an intermediate Schiff base (3).

== Mechanism ==
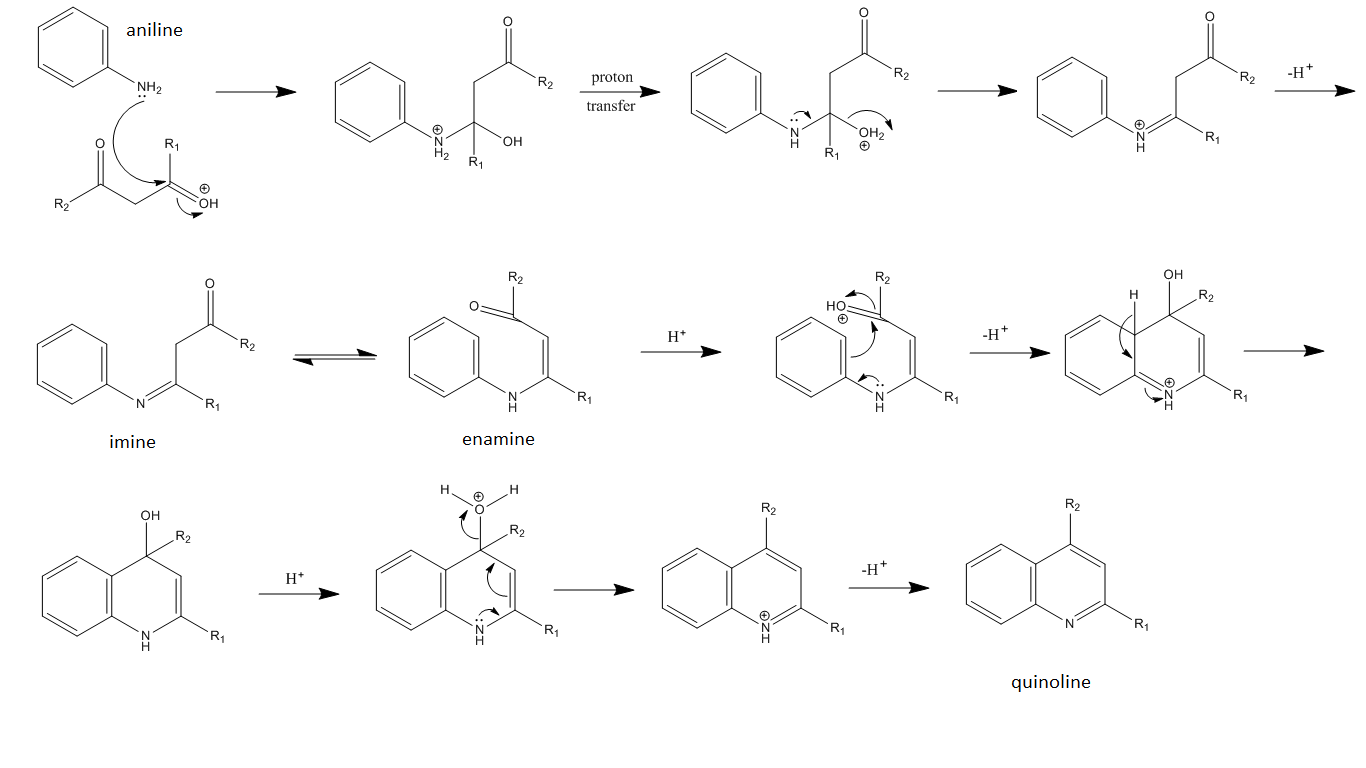
Combes Quinoline Synthesis Mechanism

The reaction mechanism undergoes three major steps, the first one being the protonation of the oxygen on the carbonyl in the β-diketone, which then undergoes a nucleophilic addition reaction with the aniline. An intramolecular proton transfer is followed by an E2 mechanism, which causes a molecule of water to leave. Deprotonation at the nitrogen atom generates a Schiff base, which tautomerizes to form an enamine that gets protonated via the acid catalyst, which is commonly concentrated sulfuric acid (H_{2}SO_{4}). The second major step, which is also the rate-determining step, is the annulation of the molecule. Immediately following the annulation, there is a proton transfer, which eliminates the positive formal charge on the nitrogen atom. The alcohol is then protonated, followed by the dehydration of the molecule, resulting in the end product of a substituted quinoline.

== Regioselectivity ==
The formation of the quinoline product is influenced by the interaction of both steric and electronic effects. In a recent study, Sloop investigated how substituents would influence the regioselectivity of the product as well as the rate of reaction during the rate-determining step in a modified Combes pathway, which produced trifluoromethylquinoline as the product. Sloop focused specifically on the influences that substituted trifluoro-methyl-β-diketones and substituted anilines would have on the rate of quinoline formation. One modification to the generic Combes quinoline synthesis was the use of a mixture of polyphosphoric acid (PPA) and various alcohols (Sloop used ethanol in his experiment). The mixture produced a polyphosphoric ester (PPE) catalyst that proved to be more effective as the dehydrating agent than concentrated sulfuric acid (H_{2}SO_{4}), which is commonly used in the Combes quinoline synthesis. Using the modified Combes synthesis, two possible regioisomers were found: 2-CF_{3}- and 4-CF_{3}-quinolines. It was observed that the steric effects of the substituents play a more important role in the electrophilic aromatic annulation step, which is the rate-determining step, compared to the initial nucleophilic addition of the aniline to the diketone. It was also observed that increasing the bulk of the R group on the diketone and using methoxy-substituted anilines leads to the formation of 2-CF_{3}-quinolines. If chloro- or fluoroanilines are used, the major product would be the 4-CF_{3} regioisomer. The study concludes that the interaction of steric and electronic effects leads to the preferred formation of 2-CF_{3}-quinolines, which provides us with some information on how to manipulate the Combes quinoline synthesis to form a desired regioisomer as the product.

Quinoline structure

== Importance of Quinoline Synthesis ==
There are multiple ways to synthesize quinoline, one of which is the Combes quinoline synthesis. The synthesis of quinoline derivatives has been prevalent in biomedical studies due to the efficiency of the synthetic methods as well as the relative low-cost production of these compounds, which can also be produced in large scales. Quinoline is an important heterocyclic derivative that serves as a building block for many pharmacological synthetic compounds. Quinoline and its derivatives are commonly used in antimalarial drugs, fungicides, antibiotics, dyes, and flavoring agents. Quinoline and its derivatives also have important roles in other biological compounds that are involved in cardiovascular, anticancer, and anti-inflammatory activities. Additionally, researchers, such as Luo Zai-gang et al., recently looked at the synthesis and use of quinoline derivatives as HIV-1 integrase inhibitors. They also looked at how the substituent placement on the quinoline derivatives affected the primary anti-HIV inhibitory activity.

== See also ==
- Conrad-Limpach reaction
- Doebner reaction
- Doebner-Miller reaction
- Skraup synthesis
