= Grieco three-component condensation =

Organic chemistry reaction

Grieco three-component coupling

Mechanism of the Grieco three-component coupling

The Grieco three-component condensation is an organic chemistry reaction that produces nitrogen-containing six-member heterocycles via a multi-component reaction of an aldehyde, a nitrogen component, such as aniline, and an electron-rich alkene. The reaction is catalyzed by trifluoroacetic acid or Lewis acids such as ytterbium trifluoromethanesulfonate (Yb(OTf)_{3}). The reaction is named for Paul Grieco, who first reported it in 1985. In the original paper the nitrogen component were benzylamine, methyl amine or ammonium chloride, the reaction now also include anilines, similar to the earlier Povarov reaction.

The reaction process involves the formation of an aryl immonium ion intermediate followed by an aza Diels-Alder reaction with an alkene. Imines are electron-poor, and thus usually function as the dienophile. Here, however, the alkene is electron-rich, so it reacts well with the immonium diene in an Inverse electron-demand Diels–Alder reaction.

Researchers have extended the Grieco three-component reaction to reactants or catalysts immobilized on solid support, which greatly expands the application of this reaction to various combinatorial chemistry settings. Kielyov and Armstrong were the first to report a solid-supported version of this reaction, they found that this reaction works well for each reactants immobilized on solid support. Kobayashi and co-workers show that a polymer-supported scandium catalyst catalyze the Grieco reaction with high efficiency.

Given the effectiveness of the reaction and the commercial availability of various Grieco partners, the Grieco three-component coupling is very useful for preparing quinoline libraries for drug discovery.

== See also ==
- Povarov reaction
