= Camps quinoline synthesis =

Organic synthesis reaction

Named after	Rudolph Camps
Reaction type	Ring forming reaction

Identifiers
RSC ontology ID	RXNO:0000524

The Camps quinoline synthesis (also known as the Camps cyclization) is a chemical reaction whereby an o-acylaminoacetophenone is transformed into two different hydroxyquinolines (products A and B) using hydroxide ion.

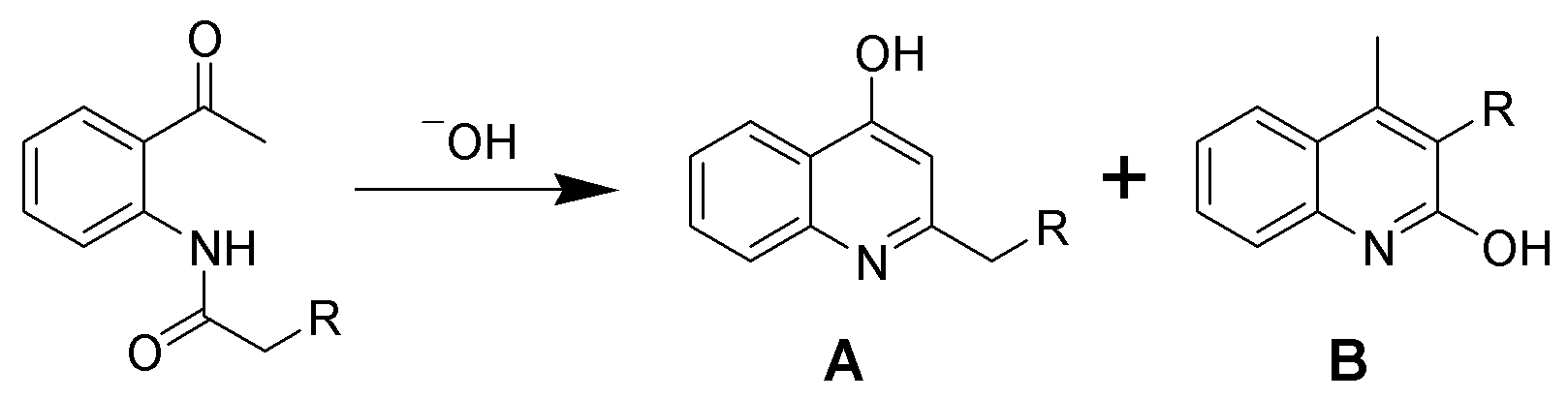
The Camps quinoline synthesis

The relative proportions of the hydroxyquinolines (A and B) produced are dependent upon the reaction conditions and structure of the starting material. Although the reaction product is commonly depicted as a quinoline (the enol form), it is believed that the keto form predominates in both the solid state and in solution, making the compound a quinolone.

An example of the Camps reaction is given below:

Camps quinoline synthesis

The amides of 1,3-enaminoketones react to form pyridinones-2 under similar conditions.

== See also ==
- Conrad-Limpach synthesis
- Doebner reaction
