= Pinacyanol =

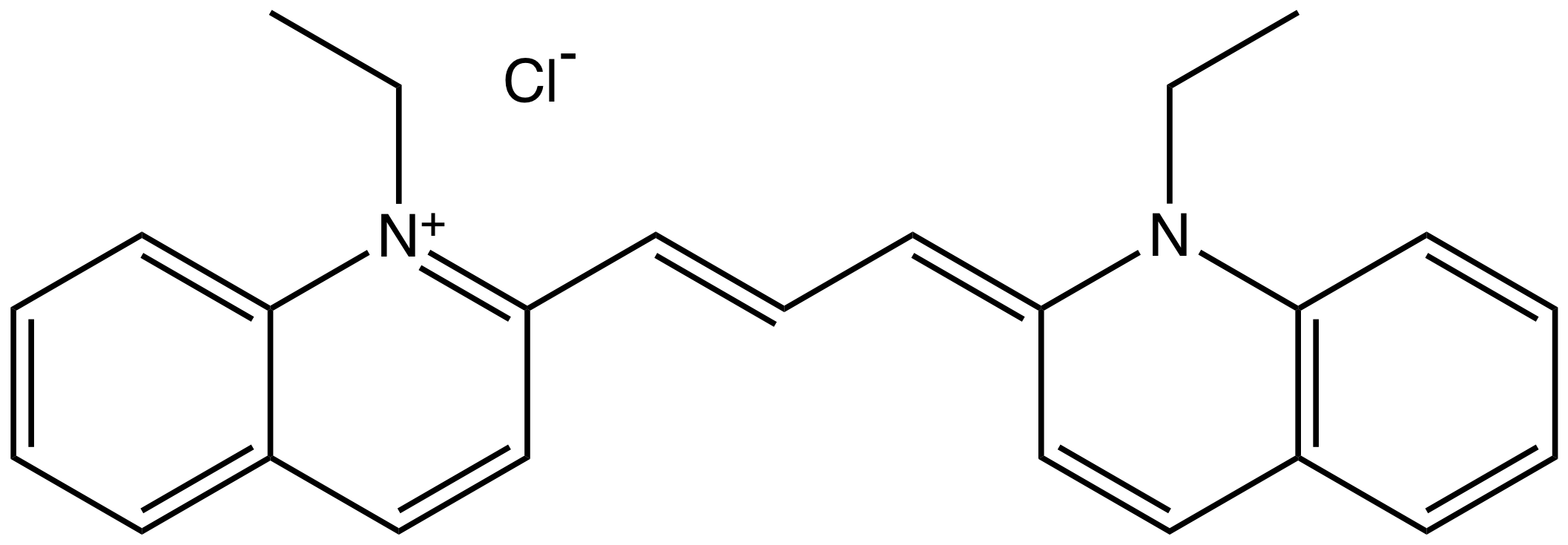

Names
- IUPAC name (2E)-1-ethyl-2-[(E)-3-(1-ethylquinolin-1-ium-2-yl)prop-2-enylidene]quinoline;chloride
- Other names Quinaldine blue

Identifiers
CAS Number	2768-90-3
3D model (JSmol)	Interactive image
ChEMBL	ChEMBL1974249
ChemSpider	4576043
ECHA InfoCard	100.009.182
EC Number	220-457-1
KEGG	D05672
PubChem CID	6364575
UNII	91SZ6DGY86
CompTox Dashboard (EPA)	DTXSID9046576
- InChI: Key: QWYZFXLSWMXLDM-UHFFFAOYSA-M; InChI=1S/C25H25N2.HI/c1-3-26-22(18-16-20-10-5-7-14-24(20)26)12-9-13-23-19-17-21-11-6-8-15-25(21)27(23)4-2;/h5-19H,3-4H2,1-2H3;1H/q+1;/p-1
- SMILES: CC[n+]1c(ccc2c1cccc2)C=CC=C3C=Cc4ccccc4N3CC.[I-]

Properties
Chemical formula	C_{25}H_{25}ClN_{2}
Molar mass	388.94 g·mol^{−1}
Appearance	blue solid

Hazards
- GHS labelling
Pictograms	(GHS07: Exclamation mark)
Signal word	Warning
Hazard statements	H315, H319, H335
Precautionary statements	P261, P264, P271, P280, P302+P352, P304+P340, P305+P351+P338, P312, P321, P332+P313, P337+P313, P362, P403+P233, P405, P501
- Except where otherwise noted, data are given for materials in their standard state (at 25 °C [77 °F], 100 kPa). Infobox references

Pinacyanol is a cyanine dye. It is an organic cation, typically isolated as the chloride or iodide salts. The blue dye is prepared from 2-methylquinoline by quaternization with ethyl chloride or ethyl iodide. Condensation with formaldehyde results in coupling. Subsequent oxidation of the leuco intermediate gives the dye. Pinacyanol is a prototypical cyanine dye that was widely used as a sensitizer in electrophotography. Its biological properties have also been investigated widely.
