= Pfitzinger reaction =

Chemical reaction

Named after	Wilhelm Pfitzinger
Reaction type	ring-condensation

Reaction
ketone or aldehyde
+
isatin
+
potassium hydroxide
↓
quinoline-4-carboxylic acid
+
water

Conditions
Typical solvents	protic

Identifiers
RSC ontology ID	RXNO:0000109

The Pfitzinger reaction (also known as the Pfitzinger-Borsche reaction) is the chemical reaction of isatin with base and a carbonyl compound to yield substituted quinoline-4-carboxylic acids.

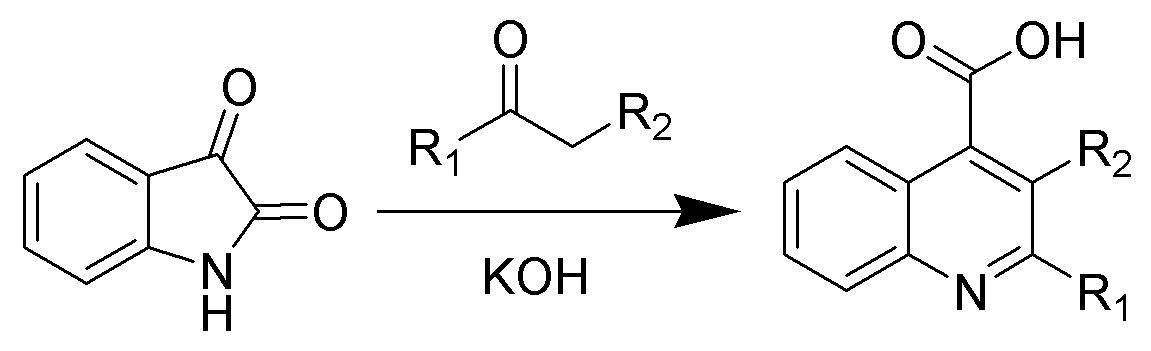
The Pfitzinger reaction

Several reviews have been published.

== Reaction mechanism ==
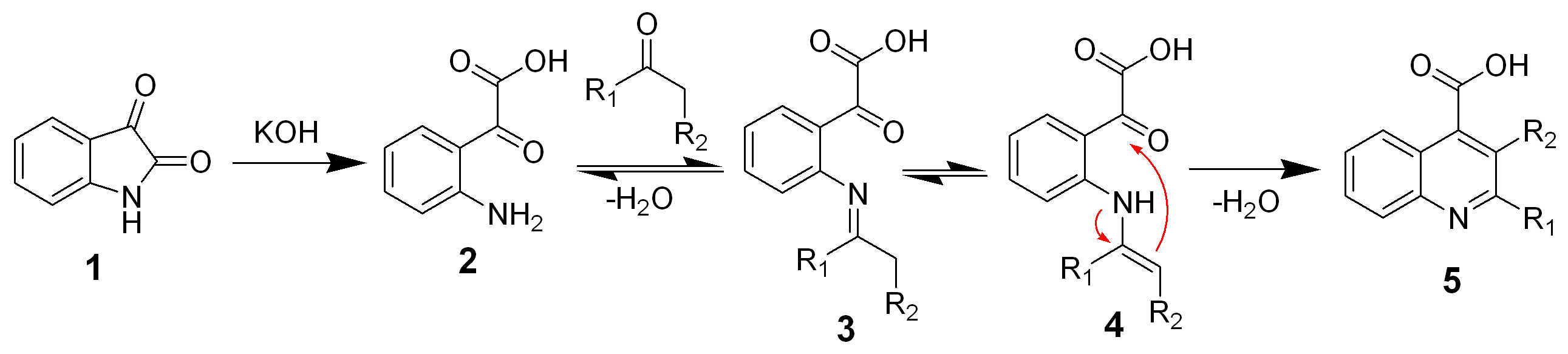
The mechanism of the Pfitzinger reaction

The reaction of isatin with a base such as potassium hydroxide hydrolyses the amide bond to give the keto-acid 2. This intermediate can be isolated, but is typically not. A ketone (or aldehyde) will react with the aniline to give the imine (3) and the enamine (4). The enamine will cyclize and dehydrate to give the desired quinoline (5).

== Variations ==
=== Halberkann variant ===
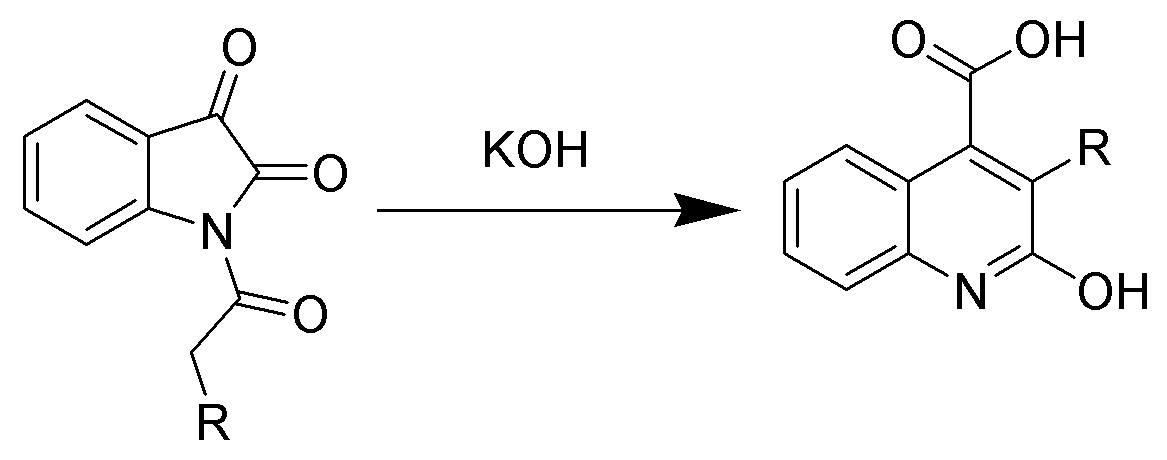
The Halberkann variant of the Pfitzinger reaction

Reaction of N-acyl isatins with base gives 2-hydroxy-quinoline-4-carboxylic acids.

== See also ==
- Camps quinoline synthesis
- Friedländer synthesis
- Niementowski quinazoline synthesis
- Doebner reaction
- Talnetant, Cinchocaine
