= 4,7-Dichloroquinoline =

Chemical compound used as an intermediate to antimalarial drugs

Names
- Preferred IUPAC name 4,7-Dichloroquinoline

Identifiers
CAS Number	86-98-6
3D model (JSmol)	Interactive image
ChEMBL	ChEMBL319828
ChemSpider	6604
ECHA InfoCard	100.001.559
EC Number	201-714-7
PubChem CID	6866
UNII	Z61O2HEQ2J
CompTox Dashboard (EPA)	DTXSID0052590
- InChI: InChI=1S/C9H5Cl2N/c10-6-1-2-7-8(11)3-4-12-9(7)5-6/h1-5H Key: HXEWMTXDBOQQKO-UHFFFAOYSA-N
- SMILES: c1cc2c(ccnc2cc1Cl)Cl

Properties
Chemical formula	C_{9}H_{5}Cl_{2}N
Molar mass	198.05 g·mol^{−1}
Appearance	White powder
Melting point	87 °C (189 °F; 360 K)
Boiling point	317 °C (603 °F; 590 K)

Hazards
- GHS labelling
Pictograms	(GHS07: Exclamation mark) (GHS09: Environmental hazard)
Signal word	Warning
Hazard statements	H315, H317, H319, H335, H411
Precautionary statements	P261, P264, P271, P272, P273, P280, P302+P352, P304+P340, P305+P351+P338, P312, P321, P332+P313, P333+P313, P337+P313, P362, P363, P391, P403+P233, P405, P501
Flash point	164 °C (327 °F; 437 K)
- Except where otherwise noted, data are given for materials in their standard state (at 25 °C [77 °F], 100 kPa). Infobox references

4,7-Dichloroquinoline is a two-ring heterocyclic compound used as a chemical intermediate to aminoquinoline antimalarial drugs including amodiaquine, chloroquine and hydroxychloroquine.

== Synthesis ==
4,7-Dichloroquinoline was first reported in a patent filed by IG Farben in 1937. However, its synthesis was not investigated in detail until chloroquine was developed as an antimalarial drug. A route to the intermediate starting from 3-chloroaniline was developed by chemists at Winthrop Chemical Co.

The substituted aniline is condensed with the diethyl ester of oxaloacetic acid under mildly acidic conditions, forming an imine, which is cyclised to form the pyridine ring by heating in mineral oil. Hydrolysis and decarboxylation follows, before the hydroxy group in the 4-position is converted into the second chloro group using phosphoryl chloride.

The availability of 4,7-dichloroquinoline allowed alternative structural analogs of the 4-aminoquinoline type to be investigated, leading to the discovery of hydroxychloroquine in 1949. By that time, chloroquine manufacturing processes had been established to allow its widespread use. 4,7-Dichloroquinoline has also been prepared by the Gould–Jacobs reaction using an alternative method of constructing the pyridine ring from 3-chloroaniline.

== Reactions ==
The chlorine atom in the 4-position in the pyridine ring is much more reactive in nucleophilic aromatic substitution reactions than the chlorine in the benzene ring. As a result, it can be replaced selectively to form derivatives at that position. A typical reaction with a specific primary amine gives chloroquine in high yield:

== Uses ==
Apart from its use in the manufacture of antimalarials already described, 4,7-dichloroquinoline is of continuing interest as an intermediate to new drug candidates.

== Derivatives List ==
4,7-Dichloroquinoline finds employment in the following list of agents: 1. Amodiaquine 2. AQ-13 3. Chloroquine 4. DC661 (DC-661) 5. EAD1 6. Ferroquine 7. FGI-104 8. Glafenine 9. Hydroxychloroquine 10. Isoquine 11. Morphoquine 12. Nicafenine 13. Naphthoquine 14. Phenylequine 15. Piperaquine 16. ROC 325 17. SSR-97193 18. Tebuquine
