= Zdenko Hans Skraup =

Czech-Austrian chemist

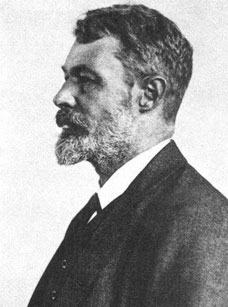
- Zdenko Hans Skraup
- Born: March 3, 1850; Prague, Bohemia, Austrian Empire
- Died: September 10, 1910 (aged 60); Vienna, Austria-Hungary
- Education: Czech Technical University in Prague
- Known for: Skraup reaction
- Awards: Lieben Prize (1886)
- Scientific career
- Workplaces: University of Graz, University of Vienna

Zdenko Hans Skraup (Czech pronunciation: [ˈzdɛŋko hans ˈskraup]; March 3, 1850 – September 10, 1910) was a chemist from Austria-Hungary, who discovered the Skraup reaction, the first quinoline synthesis.

== Life ==
Skraup was born in Prague, where he attended the Oberrealschule from 1860 till 1866 and subsequently studied (1866–1871) at the Technical University of Prague. After being assistant of Heinrich Ludwig Buff for less than a year he worked at a china factory but changed to the mint in Vienna in 1873.

He became assistant of Rochleder in 1873, although a promotion in his old job was granted. Rochleder died the following year, but Skraup stayed with his successors Franz Schneider and Adolf Lieben.

He received his Ph.D. from the University of Gießen March 17, 1875. He finished his habilitation at the University of Vienna in 1879, but because his degree was from a German university he had to wait until 1881 till he became professor at the Vienna Trade Academie.

In 1886, he changed to the University of Graz and to the University of Vienna in 1906.
