= Paul Grieco =

American chemist

Paul Grieco is an organic chemist at Montana State University. His research focuses on the total synthesis of natural products and the study of solvent effects in various organic reactions. He has received several awards for his work, including the American Chemical Society (ACS) Arthur C. Cope Scholar Award in 1990 and the ACS Award for Creative Work in Synthetic Organic Chemistry in 1991. Among his contributions are two name reactions: the Grieco elimination and the Grieco three-component condensation.
