= 2-Methyltetrahydroquinoline =

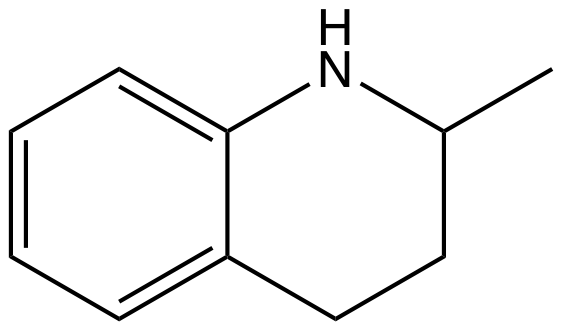

Names
- Preferred IUPAC name 2-Methyl-1,2,3,4-tetrahydroquinoline
- Other names Tetrahydroquinaldine, 1,2,3,4-Tetrahydroquinaldine

Identifiers
CAS Number	1780-19-4; (R): 63430-95-5; (S): 200125-70-8
3D model (JSmol)	Interactive image; (R): Interactive image; (S): Interactive image
ChEMBL	ChEMBL589607
ChemSpider	86920; (R): 1151452; (S): 1151451
EC Number	217-226-2; racemic (R/S): 277-887-8
PubChem CID	96289; racemic (R/S): 1376640; (R): 1376639
UNII	XHV42AW48X
CompTox Dashboard (EPA)	DTXSID80928096
- InChI: racemic (R/S): InChI=1S/C10H13N/c1-8-6-7-9-4-2-3-5-10(9)11-8/h2-5,8,11H,6-7H2,1H3/t8-/m1/s1 Key: JZICUKPOZUKZLL-MRVPVSSYSA-N; (R): InChI=1S/C10H13N/c1-8-6-7-9-4-2-3-5-10(9)11-8/h2-5,8,11H,6-7H2,1H3/t8-/m0/s1 Key: JZICUKPOZUKZLL-QMMMGPOBSA-N
- SMILES: CC1CCC2=CC=CC=C2N1; (R): C[C@@H]1CCC2=CC=CC=C2N1; (S): C[C@H]1CCC2=CC=CC=C2N1

Properties
Chemical formula	C_{10}H_{13}N
Molar mass	147.221 g·mol^{−1}
Appearance	colorless oil
Boiling point	125 °C (257 °F; 398 K) (17 Torr)

Hazards
- GHS labelling
Pictograms	(GHS07: Exclamation mark)
Signal word	Warning
Hazard statements	H315, H319
Precautionary statements	P264, P280, P302+P352, P305+P351+P338, P321, P332+P313, P337+P313, P362
- Except where otherwise noted, data are given for materials in their standard state (at 25 °C [77 °F], 100 kPa). Infobox references

2-Methyltetrahydroquinoline is one of the methyl-substituted derivatives of tetrahydroquinoline. A colorless oil, it is a chiral compound owing to the presence of the methyl substituent. It is produced by the hydrogenation of quinaldine. It is of interest in medicinal chemistry.
