= Quinaldine red =

Names
- Preferred IUPAC name 2-{(1E)-2-[4-(Dimethylamino)phenyl]ethen-1-yl}-1-ethylquinolin-1-ium iodide
- Other names 1-Ethyl-2-p-dimethylaminostyrylquinoline iodide; 2-(p-Dimethylaminostyryl)quinoline ethiodide; α-(p-Dimethylaminophenylethylene)quinolineethiodide; 2-(p-(4-Dimethylamino)styryl)-1-ethylquinolinium iodide; 2-(2-(4-(Dimethylamino)phenyl)ethenyl)-1-ethylquinolinium iodide; 2-(2-(4-(dimethylamino)phenyl)ethenyl)-1-ethyl-quinolinium iodide; 2-(p-(dimethylamino)styryl)-1-ethyl-quinolinium iodide (8CI); 2-(p-(Dimethylamino)styryl)-1-ethylquinolinium iodide; 4-[(E)-2-(1-ethylquinolin-1-ium-2-yl)ethenyl]-N,N-dimethylaniline iodide

Identifiers
CAS Number	117-92-0
3D model (JSmol)	Interactive image
ChEMBL	ChEMBL1492585
ChemSpider	4643031
ECHA InfoCard	100.003.838
EC Number	204-221-5
MeSH	Red Quinaldine Red
PubChem CID	5702759
UNII	Z70656T34N
CompTox Dashboard (EPA)	DTXSID90883309
- InChI: InChI=1S/C21H23N2.HI/c1-4-23-20(16-12-18-7-5-6-8-21(18)23)15-11-17-9-13-19(14-10-17)22(2)3;/h5-16H,4H2,1-3H3;1H/q+1;/p-1 Key: JOLANDVPGMEGLK-UHFFFAOYSA-M; InChI=1/C21H23N2.HI/c1-4-23-20(16-12-18-7-5-6-8-21(18)23)15-11-17-9-13-19(14-10-17)22(2)3;/h5-16H,4H2,1-3H3;1H/q+1;/p-1 Key: JOLANDVPGMEGLK-REWHXWOFAC
- SMILES: CC[N+]1=C(C=CC2=CC=CC=C21)C=CC3=CC=C(C=C3)N(C)C.[I-]

Properties
Chemical formula	C_{21}H_{23}IN_{2}
Molar mass	430.333 g·mol^{−1}
Appearance	dark green to black solid
Density	4.61 g/cm^{3}
Melting point	240 °C (464 °F; 513 K)
Acidity (pK_{a})	2.63
UV-vis (λ_{max})	528 nm

Hazards
NFPA 704 (fire diamond)	1 1 0
Flash point	93.3 °C (199.9 °F; 366.4 K)
Autoignition temperature	Not available
- Except where otherwise noted, data are given for materials in their standard state (at 25 °C [77 °F], 100 kPa). verify (what is ?) Infobox references

Quinaldine red (pH indicator)
below pH 1.0		above pH 2.2
(colorless) 1.0	⇌	2.2 (red)

Quinaldine red (pronounced /ˈkwɪnəldiːn/, abbreviated QR) is a dark green–red or black solid that does not dissolve easily in water (it is partly miscible). In addition to being used as colored indicator, quinaldine red is also used as a fluorescence probe and an agent in bleaching.

== Properties ==
Quinaldine red is an indicator that turns from colorless to red between a pH of 1.0–2.2. The image below shows what color quinaldine red would appear as in a given pH.

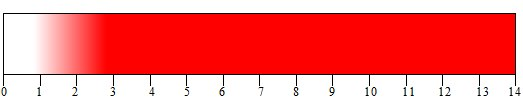
Color change of Quinaldine red in pH change

It is a cationic molecule that undergoes oxidation at different levels of pH. The rate of oxidation of Quinaldine red is in the first order with respect to the concentration of the oxidizing agent. Other factors that increases the rate of oxidation includes increasing pH and increased sodium carbonate concentration. The reaction rate eventually levels off due to the maximum formation of the product within the oxidation process.

Quinaldine red also has the ability to fluoresce. Free quinaldine red does not fluoresce in solution when it is not bound to anything, making quinaldine red only visible by fluorescence when it is bound to something. Quinaldine red can exhibit fluorescence when it is bound to nucleic acids, which then emit radiation between 580-650 nm. Maximum fluorescence of QR is detected from 557 nm to 607 nm. QR and the nucleic acids react quickly under room temperature, and the resulting QR-nucleic acid complex is able to fluorescence. However, fluorescent activity decrease as time goes on. Maximum fluorescence between QR and DNA is found within the pH range of 3.2-3.6, with the optimum being a pH 3.5. The amount of fluorescence seen with the use of QR is linearly related to the concentrations of DNA or RNA.

== Synthesis ==
QR is synthesized by a condensation reaction between the methyl group of 1-ethyl-2-methylquinolinium iodide and the carbonyl of para-dimethylaminobenzaldehyde.

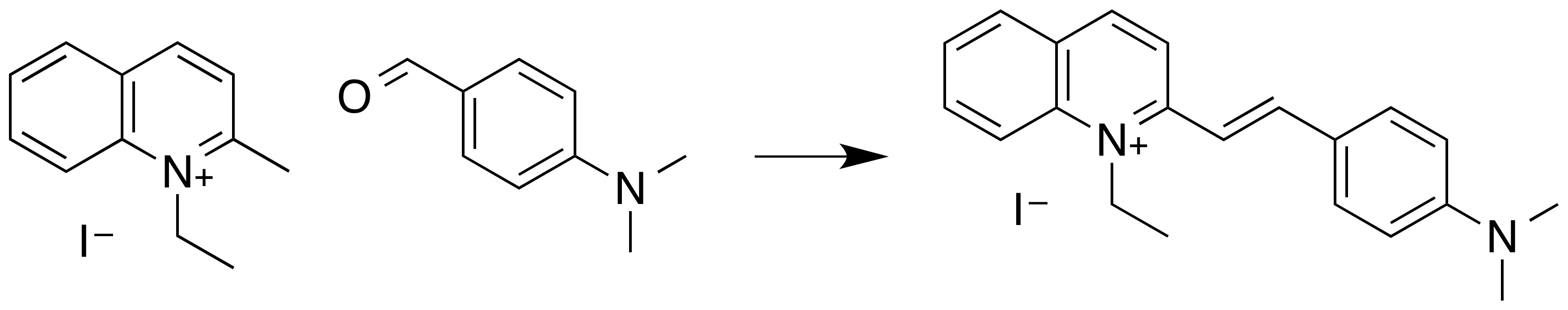

== Uses ==
QR has many uses as a fluorescent probe. The use of QR as a probe is relatively safe, inexpensive, and a sensitive method compared with other fluorescence probes like ethidium bromide or dimeric cyanine dyes. QR is also an ideal fluorescent probe because substrates of interest, such as antibodies, can be detected within a 0.3nM detection limit without the use of radiolabeled or fluorescently labeled oligonucleotides, which are the DNA components. In other words, quinaldine red is preferred tag since its binding increases the fluorescence without extra tags being needed.

The dye's ability to bind to proteins makes it a great tag. Once bound to a protein, fluorescent signals are emitted which allow the strength of QR binding to the protein to be determined. Using this technique allows for many dynamic interactions to be understood. Another variation to detecting the QR probes is by measuring the fluorescence via a spectrofluorometer. This allows the concentration of the QR-substance (could be a protein or nucleic acids) to be measured. This also indirectly allows the binding ability of QR to the substance to be measured. Using this technique gives an emission wavelength of 520/160 nm.

QR's ability to bind to substrates and fluoresce can be further utilized to determine the location of a substrate with the use of Raman spectroscopy and the electronic absorption spectra. For example, when a cell is not energized, a cell will not take up QR. When a cell is energized, aggregations of red substrate can be found within a cell, and this can be detected with Raman spectroscopy

In addition to being used as a fluorescent probe, QR can also be used as an agent in bleaching. When exposed to intensive rays such as X-rays, gamma rays, and electron beams, the dye is able to photobleach a substance. In the case of dental bleaching, a laser is the source of intensive rays. QR is dissolved in a mixture of water, ethanol, isopropyl alcohol, glycerol, and other solvents and is placed on the teeth. In the presence of oxygen, the QR and carrier particles solution uses its sensitivity to light energy to ultimately bleach teeth, making them whiter.

Quinaldine red is also used as an indicator in experiments. In an assay for inorganic and organic phosphates, QR proved to be a better indicator due to a low blank and its color stability. When being used as an indicator, a color change is involved in order to indicate a change in the pH. For example, in a solution containing inorganic phosphate and ammonium molybdate in sulfuric acid, a reaction could occur where the two substances react forming a phosphomolybdate complex ion, or no reaction could occur. In this case, if pale pink mixture of quinaldine red turns to a colorless solution, this indicates the presence of a free phosphate. If the solution turns a dark red, that indicates the phosphomolybdate complex ion has formed. By using QR as an indicator in this manner, enzymatic activities can be monitored.
