= Lepidine =

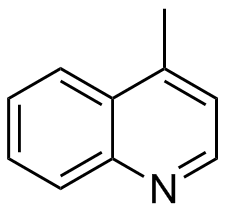

Names
- Preferred IUPAC name 4-Methylquinoline
- Other names Lepidine

Identifiers
CAS Number	491-35-0
3D model (JSmol)	Interactive image
Beilstein Reference	110926
ChEBI	CHEBI:48983
ChEMBL	ChEMBL9734
ChemSpider	13854818
ECHA InfoCard	100.007.032
EC Number	207-734-2
PubChem CID	10285
UNII	116169T3O8
CompTox Dashboard (EPA)	DTXSID7047067
- InChI: InChI=1S/C10H9N/c1-8-6-7-11-10-5-3-2-4-9(8)10/h2-7H,1H3 Key: MUDSDYNRBDKLGK-UHFFFAOYSA-N
- SMILES: Cc1ccnc2ccccc12

Properties
Chemical formula	C_{10}H_{9}N
Molar mass	143.19 g/mol
Appearance	Colorless liquid
Density	1.083 g/ml
Melting point	9 to 10 °C (48 to 50 °F; 282 to 283 K)
Boiling point	261 to 263 °C (502 to 505 °F; 534 to 536 K)
- Except where otherwise noted, data are given for materials in their standard state (at 25 °C [77 °F], 100 kPa). verify (what is ?) Infobox references

Lepidine, or 4-methylquinoline, is an organic compound with the formula C_{9}H_{6}NCH_{3}. It is one of the two commercially important methyl quinolines. It is a colorless liquid, although impure samples can appear yellow.

Its methyl group is fairly acidic, allowing for condensations to occur at this position, especially when the nitrogen is quaternized. The first cyanine dye, "quinoline blue", was prepared by quaternization of quinoline in the presence of lepidine, leading to a condensation. Thus the method required impure ingredients, which can be explained by the fact that the quinoline was distilled from coal tar. Analogues of quinoline blue gained early use in electrophotography. Several years after Williams' experiments, the structure of these intensely colored salts were determined.

Oxidation with selenium dioxide gives the aldehyde 4-formylquinoline.

== See also ==
- Quinaldine, the isomer with the methyl group in position 2.
- Quinoline
