= Isatin =

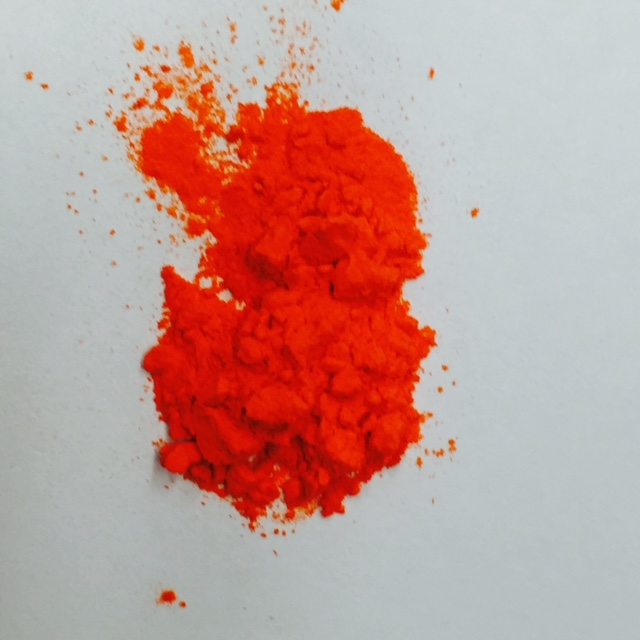

Names
- Preferred IUPAC name 1H-Indole-2,3-dione

Identifiers
CAS Number	91-56-5
3D model (JSmol)	Interactive image
Beilstein Reference	383659
ChEBI	CHEBI:27539
ChEMBL	ChEMBL326294
ChemSpider	6787
DrugBank	DB02095
ECHA InfoCard	100.001.889
EC Number	202-077-8
Gmelin Reference	165206
KEGG	C11129
PubChem CID	7054
UNII	82X95S7M06
CompTox Dashboard (EPA)	DTXSID3038694
- InChI: InChI=1S/C8H5NO2/c10-7-5-3-1-2-4-6(5)9-8(7)11/h1-4H,(H,9,10,11) Key: JXDYKVIHCLTXOP-UHFFFAOYSA-N; InChI=1/C8H5NO2/c10-7-5-3-1-2-4-6(5)9-8(7)11/h1-4H,(H,9,10,11)
- SMILES: O=C2c1ccccc1NC2=O

Properties
Chemical formula	C_{8}H_{5}NO_{2}
Molar mass	147.1308 g/mol
Appearance	Orange-red solid
Melting point	200 °C (392 °F; 473 K)

Hazards
- GHS labelling
Pictograms	(GHS07: Exclamation mark)
Signal word	Warning
Hazard statements	H302, H315, H319, H335
Precautionary statements	P261, P264, P270, P271, P280, P301+P312, P302+P352, P304+P340, P305+P351+P338, P312, P321, P330, P332+P313, P337+P313, P362, P403+P233, P405, P501
- Except where otherwise noted, data are given for materials in their standard state (at 25 °C [77 °F], 100 kPa). verify (what is ?) Infobox references

Isatin, also known as tribulin, is an organic compound derived from indole with formula C_{8}H_{5}NO_{2}. The compound was first obtained by Otto Linné Erdman and Auguste Laurent in 1840 as a product from the oxidation of indigo dye by nitric acid and chromic acids.

Isatin is a natural product which can be found in plants of the genus Isatis, in Couroupita guianensis, and also in humans, as a metabolic derivative of adrenaline.

It looks like a red-orange powder, and it is usually employed as building block for the synthesis of a wide variety of biologically active compounds including antitumorals, antivirals, anti-HIVs, and antituberculars.

The isatin core is also responsible for the color of "Maya blue" and "Maya yellow" dyes.

Studies in rats indicate that isatin modulates neurotransmitter activity, antagonizes atrial natriuretic peptide and inhibits monoamine oxidase.

== Synthesis ==
=== Sandmeyer methodology ===
The Sandmeyer methodology is the oldest and straightforward way for the synthesis of isatin. The method involves the condensation between chloral hydrate and a primary arylamine (e.g. aniline), in the presence of hydroxylamine hydrochloride, in aqueous sodium sulfate to form an α‐isonitrosoacetanilide. Isolation of this intermediate and subsequent electrophilic cyclization promoted by strong acids (e.g. sulfuric acid) furnishes isatin in >75% yield.

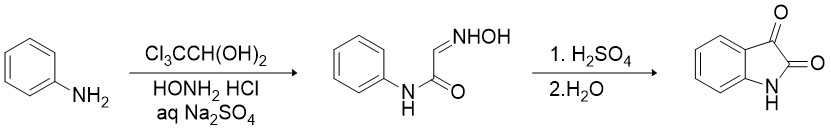
Sendmeyer synthesis of Isatin

=== Stolle methodology ===
The Stolle procedure is considered the best alternative to Sandmeyer methodology for the synthesis of both substituted and unsubstituted isatins. In this case primary or secondary arylamines are condensed with oxalyl chloride to form a chlorooxalylanilide intermediate which can then cyclize in the presence of a Lewis acid (e.g. aluminium trichloride, titanium tetrachloride, boron trifluoride, etc.).

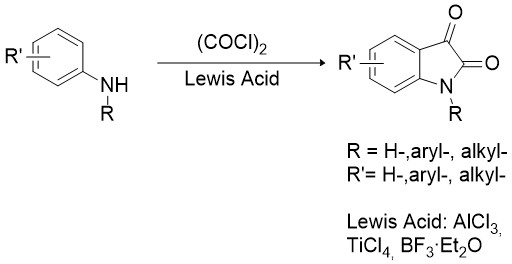

=== Other procedures ===
More recent approaches to the synthesis of N-substituted isatins involves the direct oxidation of commercially available, substituted indoles or oxindoles with different oxidizing agents such as TBHP, IBX-SO3K, tBuONO etc.

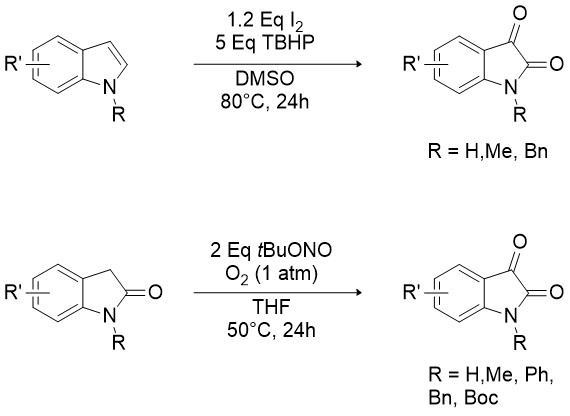
Oxidation synthesis of Isatin

== Reactivity ==
The presence of an aromatic ring, a ketone and a γ-lactam moiety, gives isatin the potential to be used as both an electrophile and a nucleophile. It undergoes an significant number of reactions, such as N-substitutions, electrophilic aromatic substitution at positions C-5 and C-7 of the phenyl ring, nucleophilic additions onto the C-3 carbonyl group, chemoselective reductions, oxidations, ring-expansions and spiro-annulations. Because of this reactivity, isatin is considered a valuable building block in organic synthesis.

=== N-Substitution ===
The N-functionalization of the isatin core can be readily obtained by the deprotonation of the amino moiety, forming the corresponding sodium or potassium salt, and subsequent addition of an electrophile (e.g. alkyl or acyl halides).

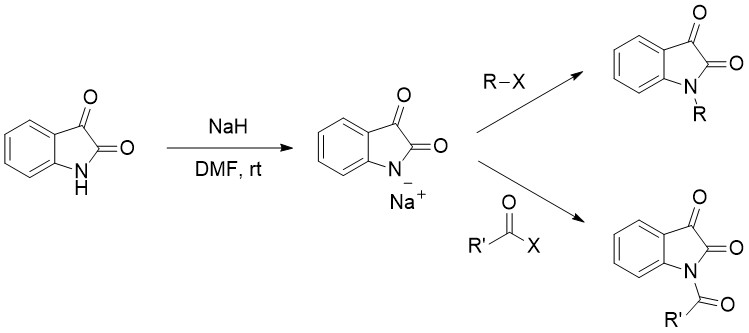
Isatin N-alkylation, acylation

On the other hand, N-arylation is usually achieved by cross-coupling reactions with aryl halides using copper or palladium catalysts.

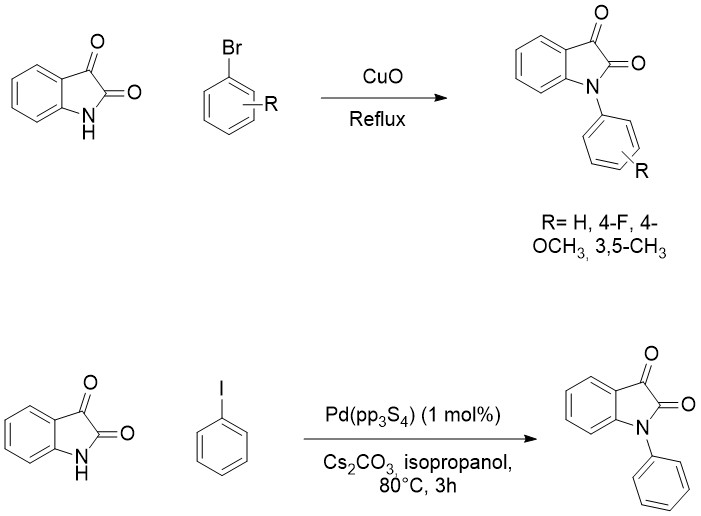
Isatin Arylation

=== Ring expansion ===
In the field of organic synthesis, ring expansions are considered valuable reactions since they allow the obtainment medium-size ring (7-9 atoms) which are difficult to synthesize through "classical" methods.

To date, only few articles concerning the ring expansion of isatin derivatives has been reported. The first one is an acid-catalyzed one-pot multicomponent reaction involving isatins, aminouracils, and isooxazolones to form isoxazoquinolines, important scaffolds in medicinal chemistry.

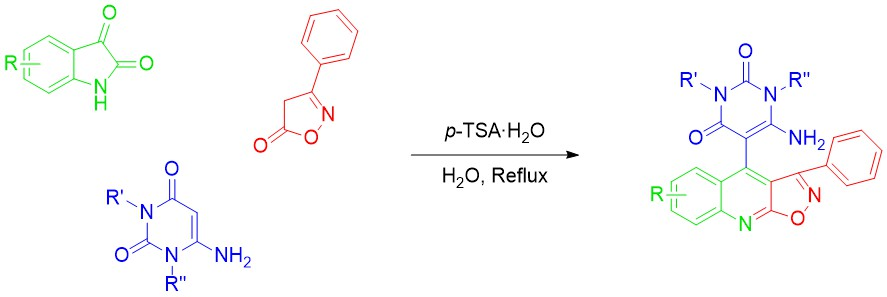
Isatin ring expansion

In another one-pot multicomponent reaction, a unique two-carbon expansion has been achieved by reacting isatin with indene-1,3-dione and N-substituted pyridinium bromide to form dibenzo[b,d]azepin-6-ones.

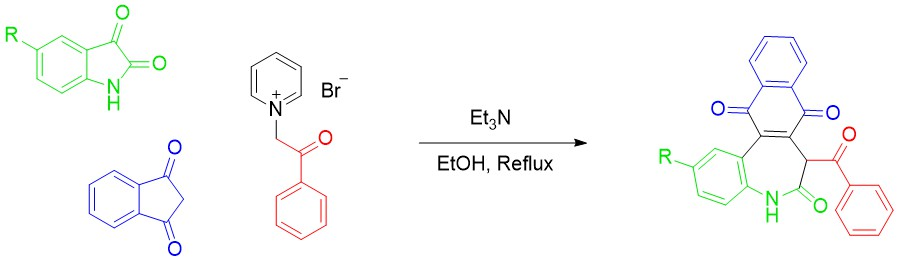
Isatin ring expansion1

=== C-2/C-3 nucleophilic addition ===
Isatin suffers nucleophilic addition on carbonyls at C-2 and C-3 positions. The regioselectivity of the process strongly depends both on the substrate (properties of the substituents on the isatin core, especially those bonded to the nitrogen atom) and the reaction conditions (solvent, temperature etc.). In some cases the nucleophilic addition could be followed by secondary reactions (e.g. cyclization, ring expansion, ring opening etc.)

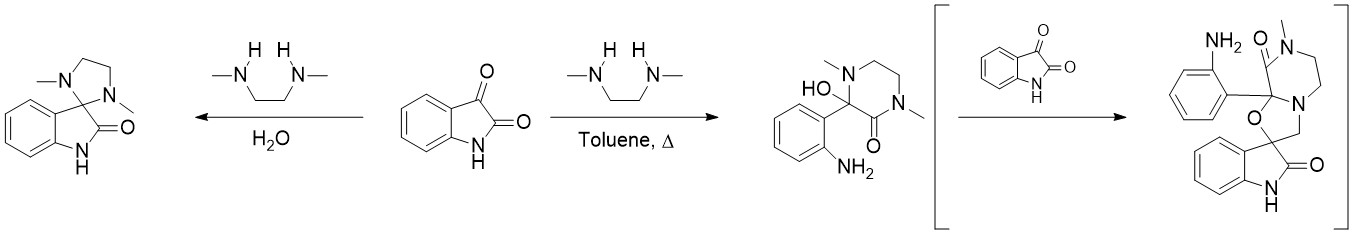
Example of solvent-dependent nucleophlic addition to isatin

=== Oxidation ===
The oxidation of isatin using hydrogen peroxide (Baeyer–Villiger oxidation) or chromic anhydride yields isatoic anhydride, a compound widely used either in herbicide products and in medicinal chemistry. The use of peroxydisulfuric acid gives rise to 1,4‑benzoxazine compounds.

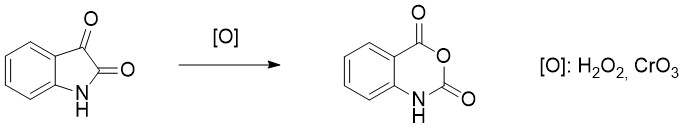
Isatin oxidation

=== Dimerization ===
Dimerization of isatin with KBH_{4} in methanol yields indirubin, representing the indigo pigment's red component and being a cytotoxic compound.

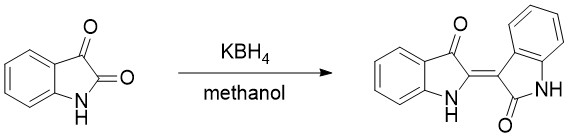
Isatin dimerization

=== Reduction ===
Reduction of the non-amide carbonyl group occurs to give oxindole.

== See also ==
- Pfitzinger reaction

== Reviews ==
- Popp, Prank D. (1975). "The Chemistry of Isatin". Advances in Heterocyclic Chemistry Volume 18. Vol. 18. pp. 1–58. doi:10.1016/S0065-2725(08)60127-0. ISBN 978-0-12-020618-6.
- Silva, Joaquim F. M. da; Garden, Simon J.; Pinto, Angelo C. (June 2001). "The chemistry of isatins: a review from 1975 to 1999". Journal of the Brazilian Chemical Society. 12 (3): 273–324. doi:10.1590/S0103-50532001000300002.
- Mesropyan, E. G.; Avetisyan, A. A. (2009). "New isatin derivatives". Russian Journal of Organic Chemistry. 45 (11): 1583. doi:10.1134/S1070428009110013. S2CID 97341279.
- Varun, Varun; Sonam, Sonam; Kakkar, Rita (2019). "Isatin and its derivatives: a survey of recent syntheses, reactions, and applications". MedChemComm. 10 (3): 351–368. doi:10.1039/C8MD00585K. PMC 6438150. PMID 30996856.
