= Amberlite =

Tradename of ion-exchange resins produced by Rohm and Haas

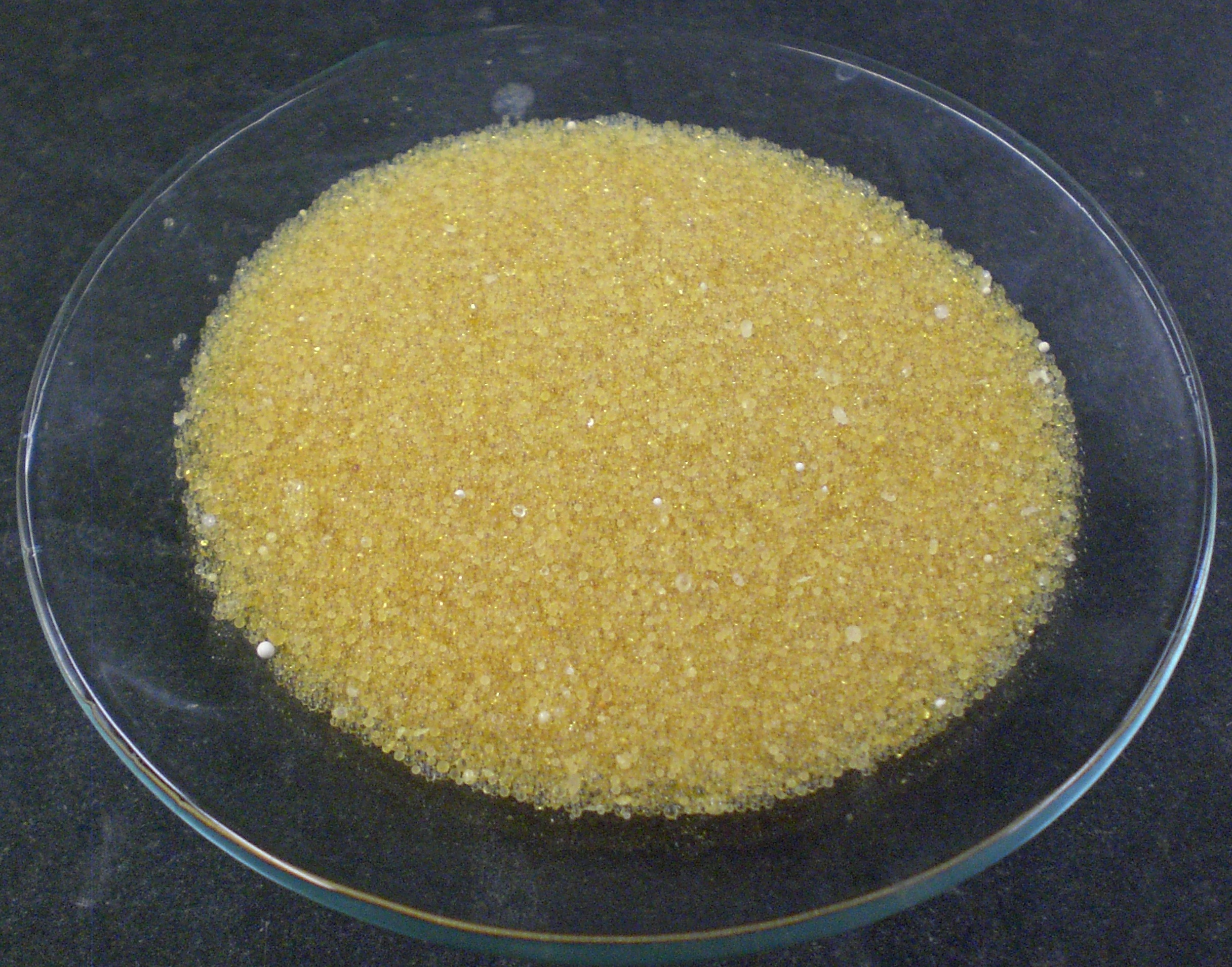
Amberlite quaternary ammonium resin

Amberlite is the tradename of a range of ion-exchange resins.
