= Quinoline =

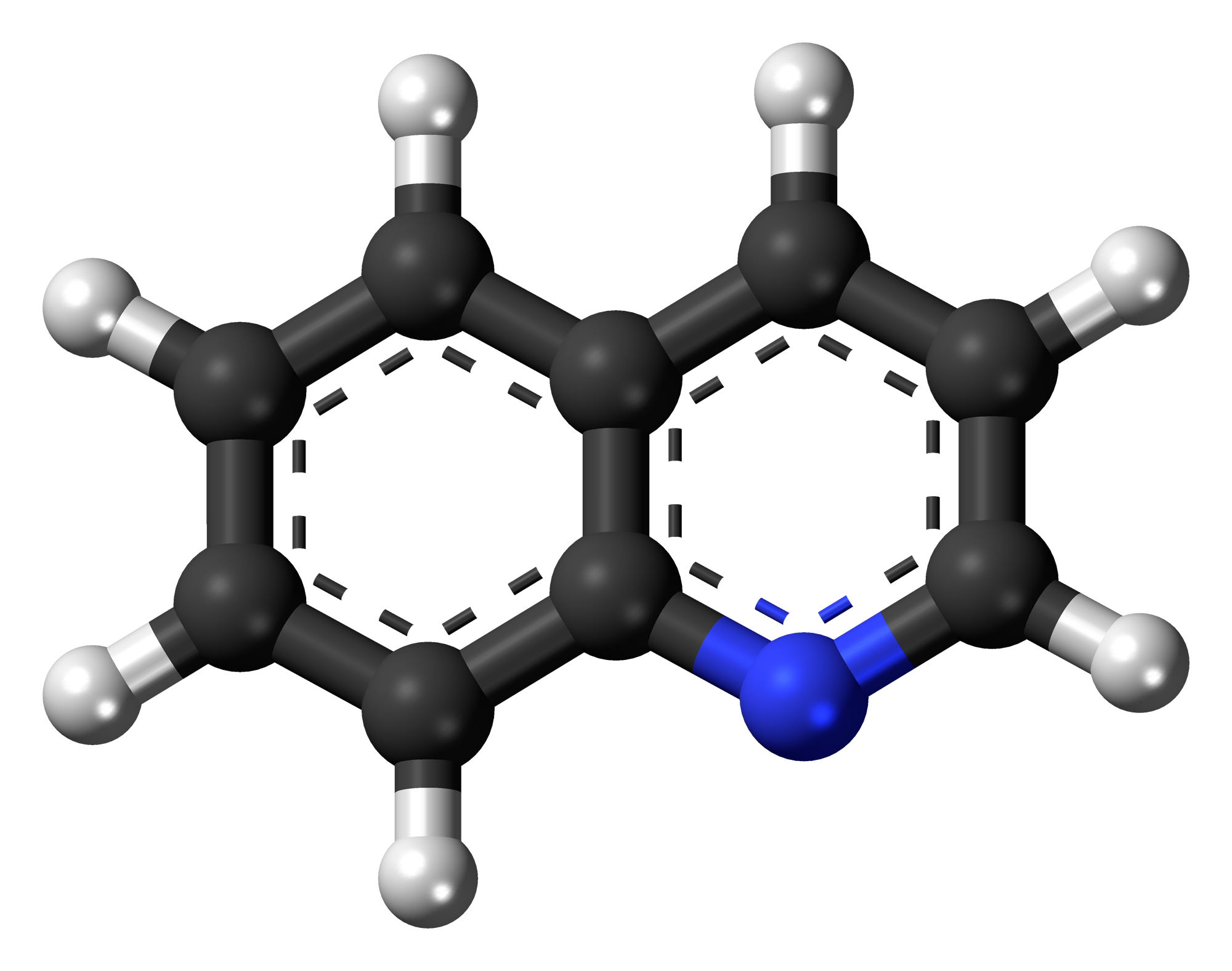
C=black, H=white, N=blue
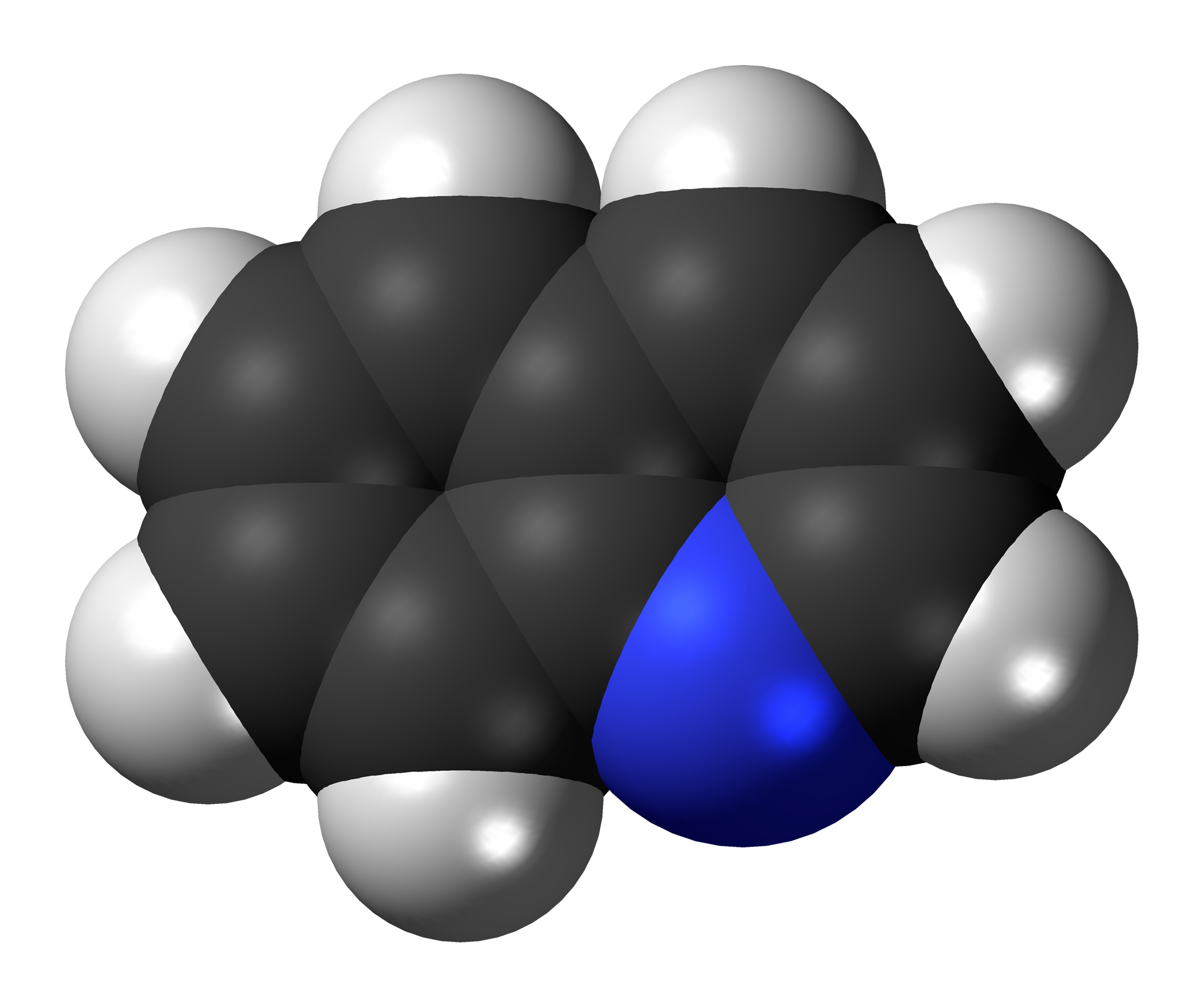
C=black, H=white, N=blue

Names
- Preferred IUPAC name Quinoline
- Systematic IUPAC name: 1-Benzopyridine; Benzo[b]pyridine; 2-Azabicyclo[4.4.0]deca-1(6),2,4,7,9-pentaene; 2-Azabicyclo[4.4.0]deca-1,3,5,7,9-pentaene; Benzo[b]azine; Benzo[b]azabenzene
- Other names: 1-Azanaphthalene; 1-Benzazine; Benzazine; Benzazabenzene; Benzopyridine; 1-Benzine; Quinolin; Chinoline; Chinoleine; Chinolin; Leucol; Leukol; Leucoline

Identifiers
| CAS Number | 91-22-5 |
| 3D model (JSmol) | Interactive image; Interactive image |
| Beilstein Reference | 107477 |
| ChEBI | CHEBI:17362 |
| ChEMBL | ChEMBL14474 |
| ChemSpider | 6780 |
| ECHA InfoCard | 100.001.865 |
| EC Number | 202-051-6 |
| Gmelin Reference | 27201 |
| KEGG | C06413 |
| MeSH | Quinolines |
| PubChem CID | 7047 |
| RTECS number | VA9275000 |
| UNII | E66400VT9R |
| UN number | 2656 |
| CompTox Dashboard (EPA) | DTXSID1021798 |
- InChI: InChI=1S/C9H7N/c1-2-6-9-8(4-1)5-3-7-10-9/h1-7H Key: SMWDFEZZVXVKRB-UHFFFAOYSA-N; InChI=1/C9H7N/c1-2-6-9-8(4-1)5-3-7-10-9/h1-7H Key: SMWDFEZZVXVKRB-UHFFFAOYAU
- SMILES: n1cccc2ccccc12; C1=CC=C2C(=C1)C=CC=N2

Properties
| Chemical formula | C_{9}H_{7}N |
| Molar mass | 129.16 g/mol |
| Appearance | Colorless oily liquid |
| Density | 1.093 g/mL |
| Melting point | −15 °C (5 °F; 258 K) |
| Boiling point | 237 °C (459 °F; 510 K) , 760 mm Hg; 108–110 °C (226–230 °F), 11 mm Hg |
| Solubility in water | Slightly soluble |
| Solubility | Soluble in alcohol, ether, and carbon disulfide |
| Acidity (pK_{a}) | 4.85 (conjugated acid) |
| Magnetic susceptibility (χ) | −86.0·10^{−6} cm^{3}/mol |

Thermochemistry
| Std enthalpy of formation (Δ_{f}H^{⦵}_{298}) | 174.9 kJ·mol^{−1} |

Hazards
- GHS labelling
| Pictograms | (GHS07: Exclamation mark) (GHS08: Health hazard) (GHS09: Environmental hazard) |
| Signal word | Danger |
| Hazard statements | H302, H312, H315, H319, H341, H350, H411 |
| Precautionary statements | P201, P202, P264, P270, P273, P280, P281, P301+P312, P302+P352, P305+P351+P338, P308+P313, P312, P321, P322, P330, P332+P313, P337+P313, P362, P363, P391, P405, P501 |
| NFPA 704 (fire diamond) | 2 1 0 |
| Flash point | 101 °C (214 °F; 374 K) |
| Autoignition temperature | 400 °C (752 °F; 673 K) |
- Lethal dose or concentration (LD, LC)
| LD_{50} (median dose) | 331 mg/kg |
- Except where otherwise noted, data are given for materials in their standard state (at 25 °C [77 °F], 100 kPa). verify (what is ?) Infobox references

Quinoline is a heterocyclic aromatic organic compound with the chemical formula C_{9}H_{7}N. It is a colorless hygroscopic liquid with a strong odor. Aged samples, especially if exposed to light, become yellow and later brown. Quinoline is only slightly soluble in cold water but dissolves readily in hot water and most organic solvents. Quinoline itself has few applications, but many of its derivatives are useful in diverse applications. A prominent example is quinine, an alkaloid found in plants. Over 200 biologically active quinoline and quinazoline alkaloids are identified. 4-Hydroxy-2-alkylquinolines (HAQs) are involved in antibiotic resistance.

== Occurrence and isolation ==
Quinoline was first extracted from coal tar in 1834 by German chemist Friedlieb Ferdinand Runge; he called quinoline leukol ("white oil" in Greek). Coal tar remains the principal source of commercial quinoline. In 1842, French chemist Charles Gerhardt obtained a compound by dry distilling quinine, strychnine, or cinchonine with potassium hydroxide; he called the compound Chinoilin or Chinolein. Runge's and Gephardt's compounds seemed to be distinct isomers because they reacted differently. However, the German chemist August Hoffmann eventually recognized that the differences in behaviors was due to the presence of contaminants and that the two compounds were actually identical. The only report of quinoline as a natural product is from the Peruvian stick insect Oreophoetes peruana. They have a pair of thoracic glands from which they discharge a malodorous fluid containing quinoline when disturbed.

Like other nitrogen heterocyclic compounds, such as pyridine derivatives, quinoline is often reported as an environmental contaminant associated with facilities processing oil shale or coal, and has also been found at legacy wood treatment sites. Owing to its relatively high solubility in water quinoline has significant potential for mobility in the environment, which may promote water contamination. Quinoline is readily degradable by certain microorganisms, such as Rhodococcus species Strain Q1, which was isolated from soil and paper mill sludge.

Quinolines are present in small amounts in crude oil within the virgin diesel fraction. It can be removed by the process called hydrodenitrification.

== Synthesis ==
Quinolines are often synthesized from simple anilines using a number of named reactions.

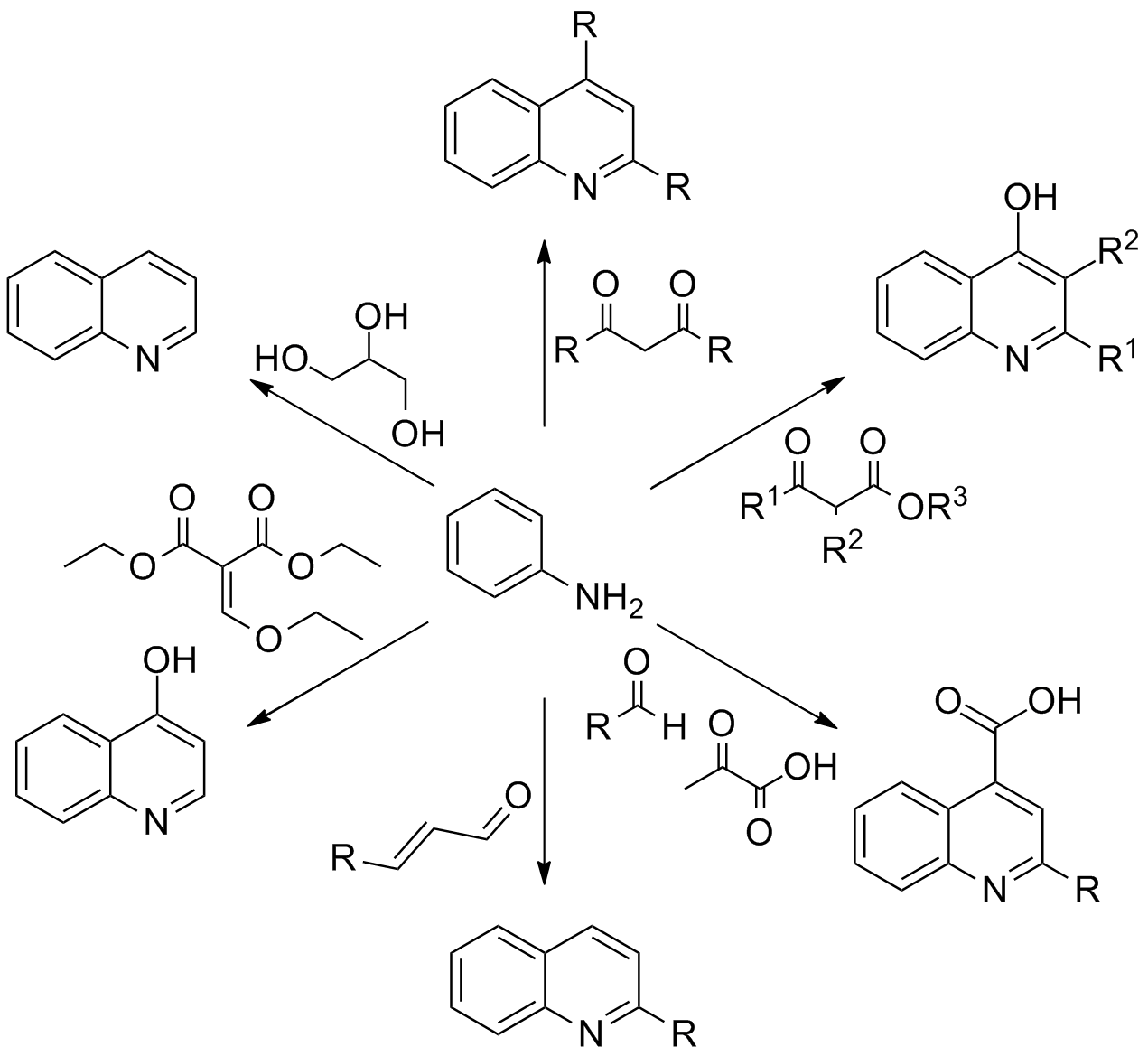

Going clockwise from top these are:

- Combes quinoline synthesis using anilines and β-diketones.
- Conrad-Limpach synthesis using anilines and β-ketoesters.
- Doebner reaction using anilines with an aldehyde and pyruvic acid to form quinoline-4-carboxylic acids
- Doebner-Miller reaction using anilines and α,β-unsaturated carbonyl compounds.
- Gould-Jacobs reaction starting from an aniline and ethyl ethoxymethylenemalonate
- Skraup synthesis using ferrous sulfate, glycerol, aniline, nitrobenzene, and sulfuric acid.

A number of other processes exist, which require specifically substituted anilines or related compounds:

- Camps quinoline synthesis using an o-acylaminoacetophenone and hydroxide
- Friedländer synthesis using 2-aminobenzaldehyde and acetaldehyde
- Knorr quinoline synthesis, using a β-ketoanilide and sulfuric acid
- Niementowski quinoline synthesis, using anthranilic acid and ketones
- Pfitzinger reaction using an isatin with base and a carbonyl compound to yield substituted quinoline-4-carboxylic acids
- Povarov reaction using an aniline, a benzaldehyde and an activated alkene

Quinolines are reduced to tetrahydroquinolines enantioselectively using several catalyst systems.

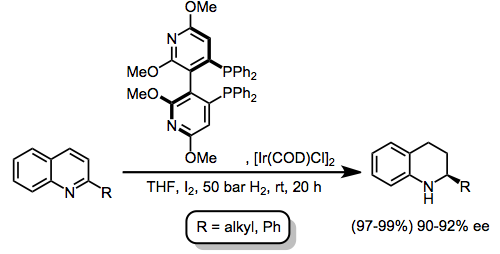

== Applications ==
Quinolines are used in the manufacture of dyes and the preparation of hydroxyquinoline sulfate and niacin. It is also used as a solvent for resins and terpenes.

Prior to the development of aspirin, quinoline was occasionally used for pain, but had a very bad taste and smell along with serious side effects.

Quinoline is mainly used as in the production of other specialty chemicals. Approximately 4 tonnes were produced annually according to a report published in 2005. Its principal use is as a precursor to 8-hydroxyquinoline, which is a versatile chelating agent and precursor to pesticides. Its 2- and 4-methyl derivatives are precursors to cyanine dyes. Oxidation of quinoline affords quinolinic acid (pyridine-2,3-dicarboxylic acid), a precursor to the herbicide sold under the name Assert.

The reduction of quinoline with sodium borohydride in the presence of acetic acid produces kairoline A.

Several anti-malarial drugs contain quinoline substituents. These include quinine, chloroquine, amodiaquine, and primaquine.

Quinoline is used as a solvent and reagent in organic synthesis.

Quinolinium compounds, including its salts, can also be used as corrosion inhibitors and intensifiers.

== See also ==
- Quinoline alkaloids
- 4-Aminoquinoline
- 8-Hydroxyquinoline
- Pyrroloquinoline quinone (PQQ), a redox cofactor and controversial nutritional supplement
- Quinazoline, an aza derivative of quinoline
- Quinine
- Similar simple aromatic rings
  - Isoquinoline, an analog with the nitrogen atom in position 2
  - Pyridine, an analog without the fused benzene ring
  - Naphthalene, an analog with a carbon instead of the nitrogen
  - Indole, an analog with only a five-membered nitrogen ring
