= 4-Quinolone =

Names
- Preferred IUPAC name Quinolin-4(1H)-one
- Other names 1H-Quinolin-4-one

Identifiers
CAS Number	529-37-3
3D model (JSmol)	Interactive image
ChEBI	CHEBI:155900
ChemSpider	62357
EC Number	210-268-2
PubChem CID	69141
UNII	M1O131WXFO
- InChI: InChI=1S/C9H7NO/c11-9-5-6-10-8-4-2-1-3-7(8)9/h1-6H,(H,10,11) Key: PMZDQRJGMBOQBF-UHFFFAOYSA-N
- SMILES: C1=CC=C2C(=C1)C(=O)C=CN2

Properties
Chemical formula	C_{9}H_{7}NO
Molar mass	145.161 g·mol^{−1}
Melting point	208 to 210 °C (406 to 410 °F; 481 to 483 K)
- Except where otherwise noted, data are given for materials in their standard state (at 25 °C [77 °F], 100 kPa). Infobox references

4-Quinolone is an organic compound derived from quinoline. It and 2-quinolone are the two most important parent (meaning simplified) quinolones. 4-Quinolone exists in equilibrium with a minor tautomer, 4-hydroxyquinoline (CAS#611-36-9). Aside from pedagogical interest, 4-quinolone is of little intrinsic value but its derivatives, the 4-quinolone antibiotics, represent a large class of important drugs.

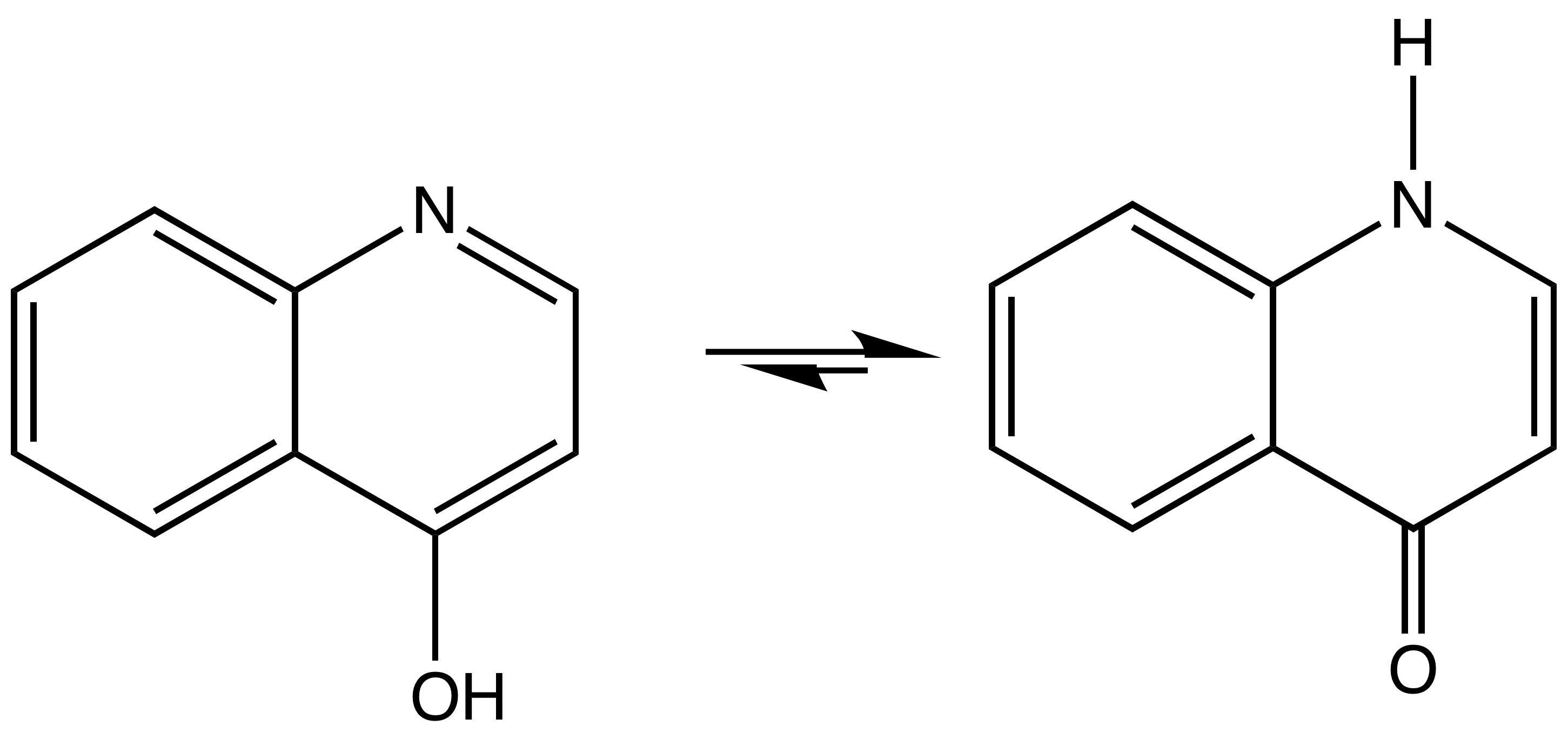
The tautomeric equilibrium relating 4-quinolone (right) and 4-hydroxyquinoline (left)

== Synthesis ==
The chemical synthesis of quinolones often involves ring-closing reactions. Such reactions often install a hydroxyl group (an –OH functional group) on the carbon across from the ring nitrogen (i.e., the C-4 positions). An example of such a synthesis is the Camps cyclization, which, depending on starting materials and reaction conditions, can give both 2-hydroxyquinolines (B) and 4-hydroxyquinolines (A) as shown. The hydroxyquinolines tautomerize to the quinolones.

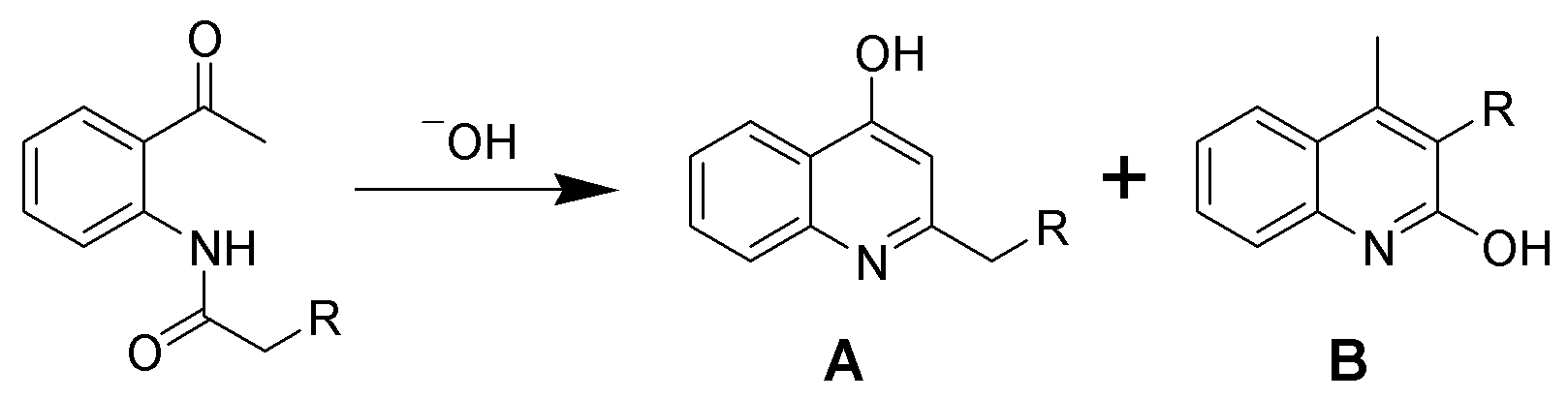
The Camps cyclization, a quinoline synthesis giving 2- and 4-hydroxyquinolines.
