= Doebner reaction =

Chemical reaction

The Doebner reaction is the chemical reaction of an aniline with an aldehyde and pyruvic acid to form quinoline-4-carboxylic acids.

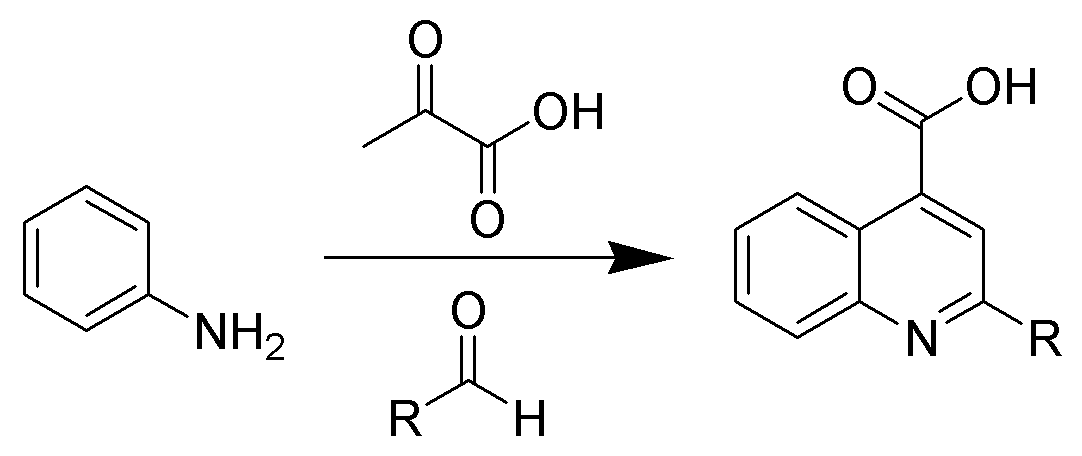
The Doebner reaction

The reaction serves as an alternative to the Pfitzinger reaction.

== Reaction mechanism ==
The reaction mechanism is not exactly known; two proposals are presented here. One possibility is at first an aldol condensation, starting from the enol form of the pyruvic acid (1) and the aldehyde, forming an β,γ-unsaturated α-ketocarboxylic acid (2). This is followed by a Michael addition with aniline to form an aniline derivative (3). After a cyclization at the benzene ring and two proton shifts, the quinoline-4-carboxylic acid (4) is formed by water elimination:

Reaktionsmechanismus-Vorschlag (1) der Doebner-Reaktion

An alternative mechanism is based on the aniline and the aldehyde forming at first the Schiff base upon water elimination. The subsequent reaction with the enol form of pyruvic acid (1) leads to the formation of the above-mentioned aniline derivative (3) followed by the above-described reaction mechanism:

Reaktionsmechanismus-Vorschlag (2) der Doebner-Reaktion

== Side reactions ==
It is reported in the literature that the Doebner reaction fails in case of 2-chloro-5-aminopyridine. In this case the cyclization would take place at the amino group instead of the benzene ring and lead to a pyrrolidine derivative.

== Alternative reactions ==
Alternative syntheses of quinoline derivatives are for example:

- Pfitzinger reaction
- Conrad-Limpach reaction
- Doebner-Miller reaction
- Combes quinoline synthesis
