= Skraup reaction =

Chemical reaction used to synthesize quinolines

Named after	Zdenko Hans Skraup
Reaction type	Ring forming reaction

Identifiers
RSC ontology ID	RXNO:0000062

The Skraup reaction, or Skraup synthesis, is a chemical reaction used to synthesize quinolines. It is named after the Czech chemist Zdenko Hans Skraup (1850–1910). In the archetypal Skraup reaction, aniline is heated with sulfuric acid, glycerol, and an oxidizing agent such as nitrobenzene to yield quinoline.

The Skraup reaction

In this example, nitrobenzene serves as both the solvent and the oxidizing agent. The reaction, which otherwise has a reputation for being violent, is typically conducted in the presence of ferrous sulfate. Arsenic acid may be used instead of nitrobenzene and the former is better since the reaction is less violent.

== See also ==
- Bischler–Napieralski reaction
- Doebner–Miller reaction
