= Knorr quinoline synthesis =

Chemical reaction

Named after	Ludwig Knorr
Reaction type	Ring forming reaction

Identifiers
RSC ontology ID	RXNO:0000394

The Knorr quinoline synthesis is an intramolecular organic reaction converting a β-ketoanilide to a 2-hydroxyquinoline using sulfuric acid. This reaction was first described by Ludwig Knorr (1859–1921) in 1886

Knorr quinoline synthesis

The reaction is a type of electrophilic aromatic substitution accompanied by elimination of water. A 1964 study found that with certain reaction conditions formation of a 4-hydroxyquinoline is a competing reaction. For instance, the compound benzoylacetanilide (1) forms the 2-hydroxyquinoline (2) in a large excess of polyphosphoric acid (PPA) but 4-hydroxyquinoline 3 when the amount of PPA is small. A reaction mechanism identified a N,O-dicationic intermediate A with excess acid capable of ring-closing and a monocationic intermediate B which fragments to aniline and (ultimately to) acetophenone. Aniline reacts with another equivalent of benzoylacetanilide before forming the 4-hydroxyquinoline.

Staskun 1964 Knorr cyclization reaction mechanism

A 2007 study revised the reaction mechanism showing that based on NMR spectroscopy and theoretical calculations an O,O-dicationic intermediate (a superelectrophile) is favored comparing to the N,O dicationic intermediate. For preparative purposes triflic acid is recommended:

Knorr Cyclization with triflic acid Sai 2007
