= C4H6N2 =

The molecular formula C_{4}H_{6}N_{2} may refer to:

- Methylpyrazole
  - 1-Methylpyrazole
  - 3-Methylpyrazole
  - Fomepizole (4-methylpyrazole)
- Methylimidazole
  - 1-Methylimidazole
  - 2-Methylimidazole
  - 4-Methylimidazole
- 1,4-Dihydropyrazine
