= Żmurko =

Żmurko is a surname. Notable people with the surname include:

- Franciszek Żmurko (1859–1910), Polish painter
- Wawrzyniec Żmurko (1824–1889), Polish mathematician
