= Hanna Kos =

Ukrainian historian, art historian (1940–2018)

- Ганна Іванівна Кос
- Born: 7 December 1940; Lviv
- Died: 20 November 2018 (aged 77); Lviv
- Education: University of Lviv
- Occupations: Historian, art historian

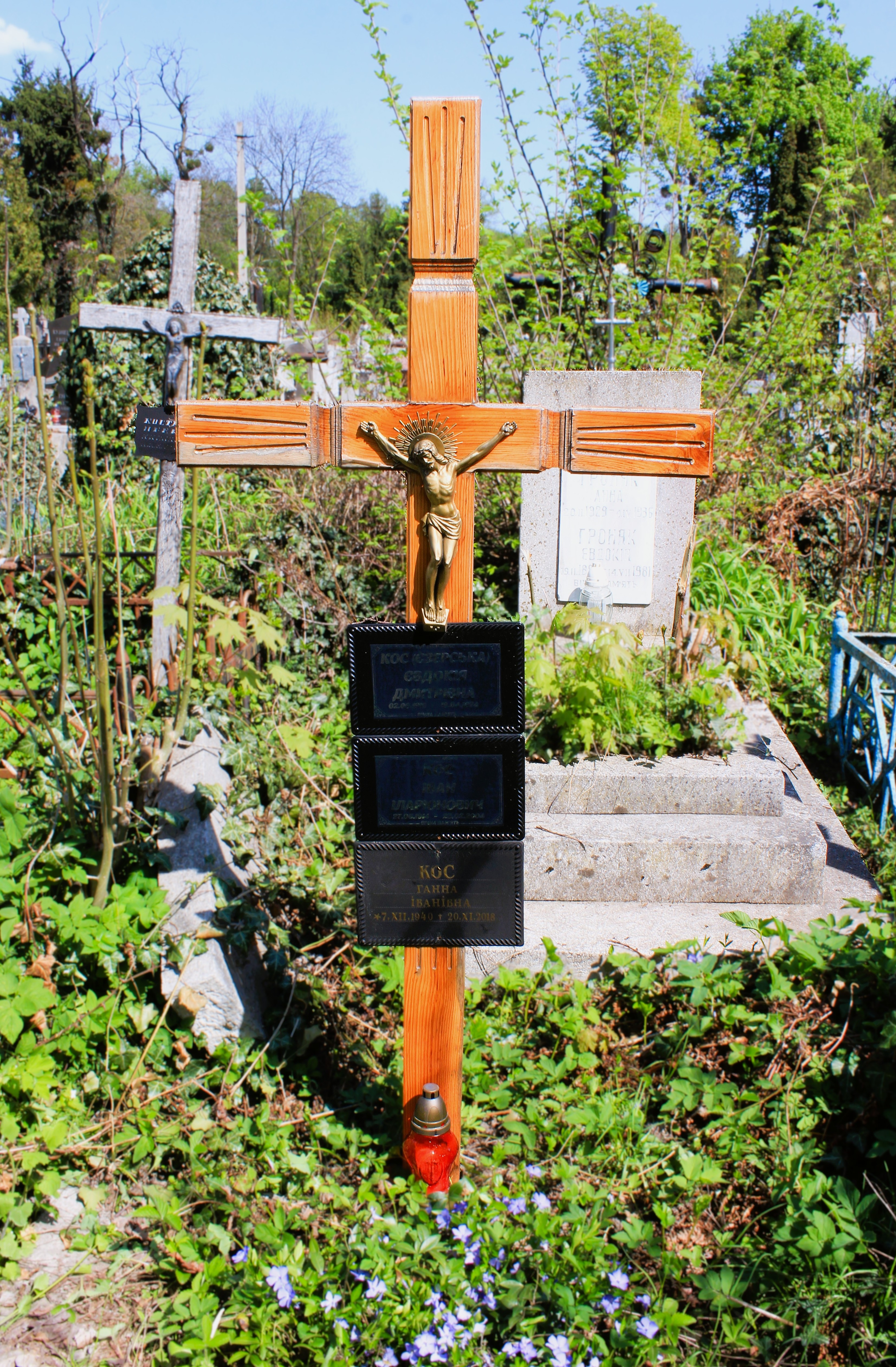
Hanna Kos's grave at the Yaniv cemetery.

Hanna Kos (Ukrainian: Ганна Іванівна Кос; 7 December 1940 – 20 November 2018) was a Ukrainian historian, art historian. In 1992 she became a candidate of historical sciences. In 1993 she became a member of the National Union of Artists of Ukraine.

== Biography ==
Hanna Kos was born on 7 December 1940 in Lviv.

In 1965 she graduated from the Faculty of History at the University of Lviv. During her studies, she worked as an archivist, a researcher at the Lviv Regional Archives, and a freelance laboratory assistant at the Department of Archeology at the Institute of Social Sciences of the Ukrainian SSR. For 15 years she was a member of archaeological expeditions.

In 1966, she began working as a researcher at the Lviv Museum of the History of Religion, and in 1972–1976 she was a senior researcher at the Lviv Art Gallery. In 1976–1995 she worked as a senior researcher at the State Historical and Architectural Reserve in Lviv. In 1995, she started working at the Lviv Polytechnic National University as a senior lecturer at the Department of Philosophy and Cultural Studies, Department of History of Ukraine, Science and Technology. From 2000, she worked at the Lviv Polytechnic Museum of History, where she formed the exposition; she became the head of the institution in 2011.

She died on 20 November 2018 in Lviv, where she was buried on the 12th field of the Yaniv Cemetery.

== Works ==
She is the author of scientific publications and editions; biographical sketches on famous Ukrainians, including Vitalii Yurchenko, Olena Stepaniv, Ihor Loskyi, Wawrzyniec Żmurko, Yulian Medvedskyi, Donat Lenhauer, and others. She initiated the reissue of Kuzma Kazdoba book "Zametenyi shliakh" in Ukraine.

She researched the architecture of Lviv, in particular, Kos was responsible for archaeological research and conservation of a fragment of the eastern part of the city's defensive walls.

Among his main works:

- "Ukrainska dilnytsia serednovichnoho Lvova. Do pytannia istorii budivnytstva ta arkhitektury ХV — ХІХ st.",
- "Khudozhnii metal u zabudovi serednovichnoho Lvova ХVІ — ХVІІІ st.",
- "Khudozhnie kameniarstvo u Lvovi. Kinets ХVІ — ІІ polovyna ХVІІІ st.",
- "Zolota doba renesansu. Istoryko-kulturni ta kraieznavchi narysy".

Essays-guides:

- "Vulytsia Ruska u Lvovi" (1996, co-author Roman Fedyna),
- "Muzei istorii Lvivskoi politekhniky" (2009),
- "Ploshcha Rynok u Lvovi" (2013).

Books:

- "Spadshchyna velykoho budivnychoho. Profesor Lvivskoi politekhniky Ivan Levynskyi (1851—1919)" (2009, co-author Liliia Onyshchenko),
- "Nashi zhyvi lehendy" (2006),
- "Z-pid znaku Striltsia" (2013).
