= C3H4N2 =

The molecular formula C_{3}H_{4}N_{2} may refer to:

- Diazoles, a heterocycle with two nitrogen atoms in the ring
  - Imidazole, with non-adjacent nitrogen atoms
  - Pyrazole, with adjacent nitrogen atoms
