= Niementowski quinoline synthesis =

Chemical reaction

Named after	Stefan Niementowski
Reaction type	Ring forming reaction

The Niementowski quinoline synthesis is the chemical reaction of anthranilic acids and ketones (or aldehydes) to form γ-hydroxyquinoline derivatives.

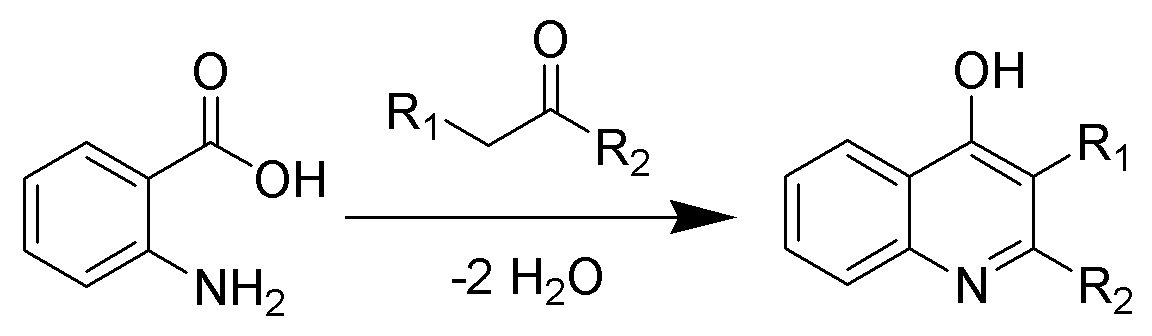
The Niementowski quinoline synthesis

== Overview ==
In 1894, Niementowski reported that 2-phenyl-4-hydroxyquinoline was formed when anthranilic acid and acetophenone were heated to 120–130 °C. He later found that at higher heat, 200 °C, anthranilic acid and heptaldehyde formed minimal yields of 4-hydroxy-3-pentaquinoline. Several reviews have been published.

== Variations ==
The temperatures required for this reaction make it less popular than other quinoline synthetic procedures. However, variations have been proposed to make this a more pragmatic and useful reaction. Adding phosphorus oxychloride to the reaction mixture mediates a condensation to make both isomers of an important precursor to an important α_{1}-adrenoreceptor antagonist. When the 3 position of an arylketone is substituted, it has been shown that a Niementowski-type reaction with propionic acid can produce a 4-hydroxyquinoline with 2-thiomethyl substitute. The method has also been altered to occur with a catalytic amount of base, or in the presence of polyphosphoric acid.

== Mechanism ==
Because of the similarity of these to the reagents in the Friedlander quinolone synthesis, a benzaldehyde with an aldehyde or ketone, the Niementowski quinoline synthesis mechanism is minimally different from that of the Friedländer synthesis. While studied in depth, two reaction pathways are possible and both have significant support. The reaction is thought to begin with the formation of a Schiff base, and then proceed via an intra-molecular condensation to make an imine intermediate (see below). There is then a loss of water that leads to a ring closing and formation of the quinoline derivative. Most evidence supports this as the mechanism in normal conditions of 120–130 °C. Alternatively, the reaction begins with an intermolecular condensation and subsequent formation of the imine intermediate. The latter has been shown to be more common under acidic or basic conditions. A similar pathway has been proposed for the Niementowski quinazoline synthesis.

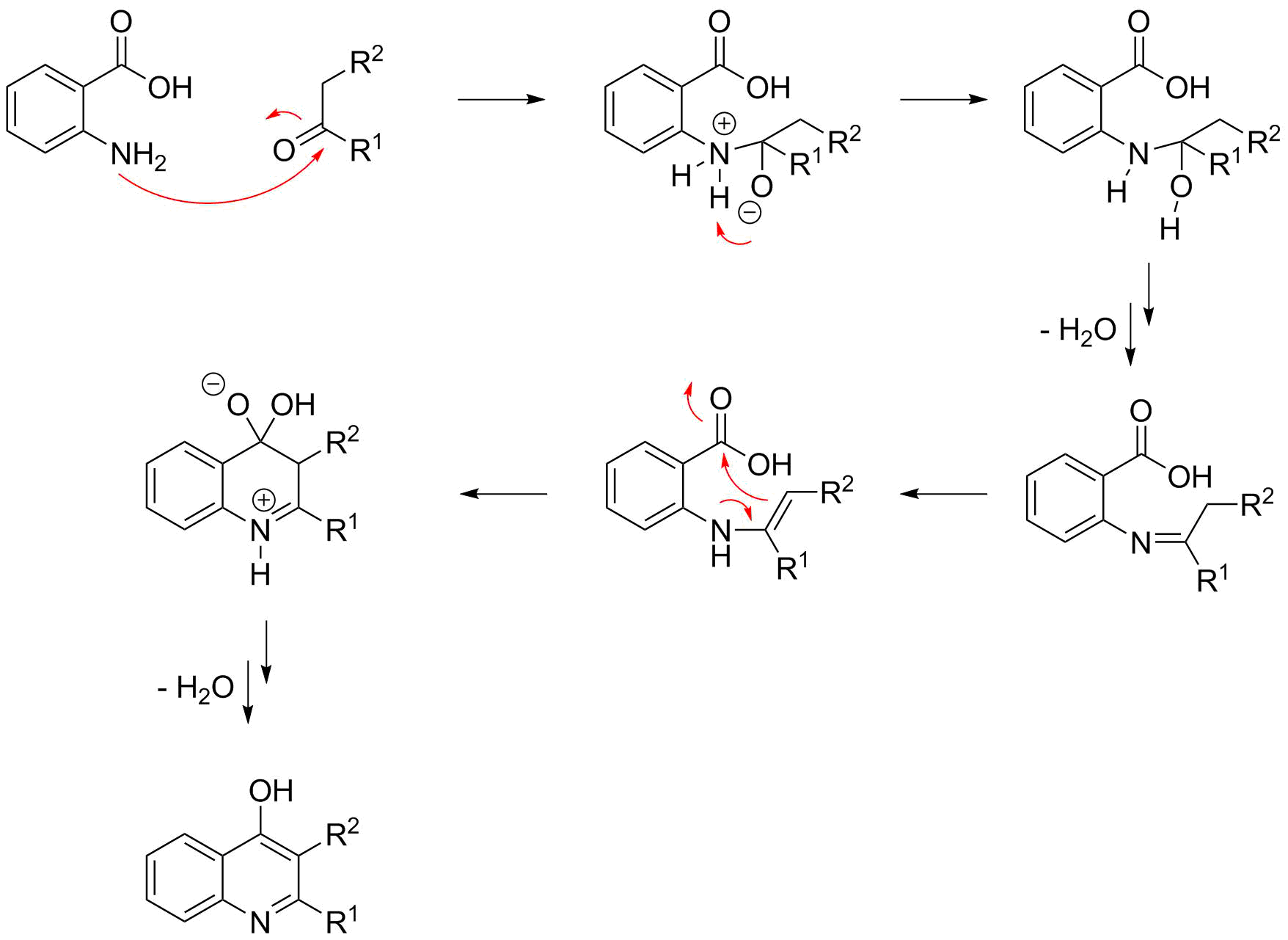

== Bibliography ==
- Hartz, R. (2011) in Name Reactions in Heterocyclic Chemistry II, Jie Jack Li, E. J. Corey (eds.), Wiley, ISBN 978-0-470-08508-0.

== See also ==
- Camps quinoline synthesis
- Friedländer synthesis
- Pfitzinger reaction
