= Cosmos (comics) =

Cosmos, in comics, may refer to:

- Cosmos (Transformers), a Transformer who has appeared in the comic books based on the toys
- Cosmos, a Wildstorm character from Welcome to Tranquillity
- Cosmos, an Image Comics character from Red Mass for Mars by Jonathan Hickman
- Cosmos, a DC Comics character from Green Lantern

== See also ==
- Cosmos (disambiguation)
- Kosmos (comics)
