= Kosmos (comics) =

Kosmos, in comics, may refer to:

- Kosmos (Marvel Comics), a Marvel Comics character
- Kid Kosmos, a character created by Jim Starlin
- King Kosmos, a DC Comics character

== See also ==
- Cosmos (disambiguation)
- Cosmos (comics)
