= Methylimidazole =

Methylimidazole may refer to several related chemical compounds:

- 1-Methylimidazole
- 2-Methylimidazole
- 4-Methylimidazole, which is chemically distinct from, but readily interconvertable with 5-methylimidazole
