= Bronisław Radziszewski =

Polish chemist (1838–1914)

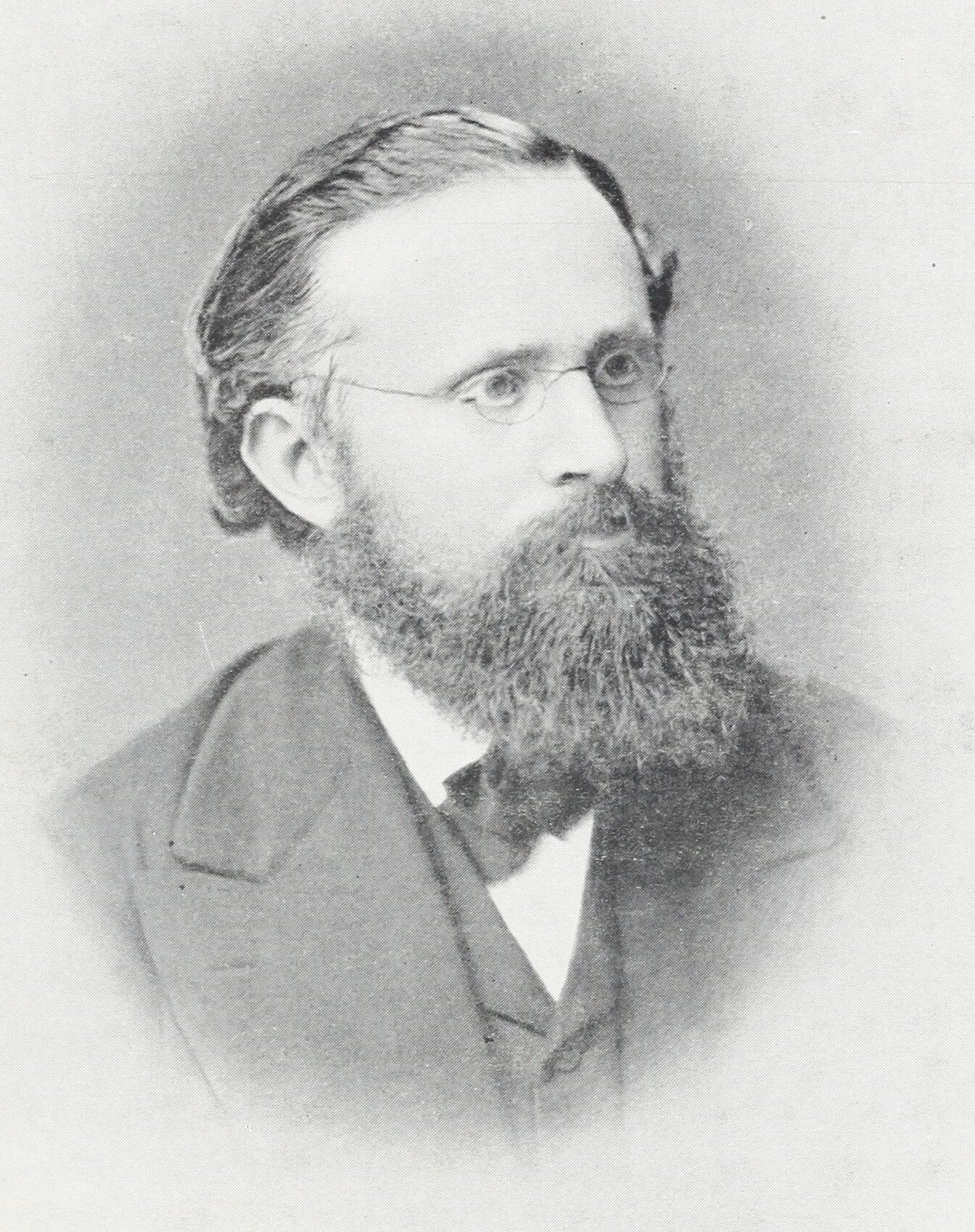
- Born: 11 May 1838; Warsaw, Congress Poland
- Died: 11 March 1914 (aged 75); Lviv, Kingdom of Galicia and Lodomeria
- Education: Moscow State University
- Known for: Debus-Radziszewski reaction
- Awards: Order of the Iron Crown
- Scientific career
- Fields: Chemistry
- Workplaces: Catholic University of Leuven; University of Lwów

Bronisław Leonard Radziszewski (Germanized as: Bronislaus Radziszewski; Polish: [rad͡ʑiˈʂɛfski]; 11 May 1838 – 11 March 1914) was a Polish chemist active in Imperial Russia and Austria-Hungary. He is the co-founder of the Polish Copernicus Society of Naturalists. He served as a professor of chemistry at the Technical University of Krakow and later at the University of Lviv. He worked mainly in organic chemistry. A reaction used for the synthesis of imidazole from an aldehyde and a α-dicarbonyl compound is known as the Debus-Radziszewski reaction.

== Life and work ==
Radziszewski was born in Warsaw to father Franciszek and mother Franciszka (née Weynert). After studying at the local gymnasium he went to the University of Moscow in 1855 and received a degree in the natural sciences in 1861. He returned to Warsaw and began to teach at the 3rd Gymnasium from 1862. He was a part of the National Government during the January Uprising and worked as a commissioner in the Augustów province under the pseudonym Ignacy Czyński. In 1863 he worked as an assistant secretary to the government under Joseph Kajetan Janowski.

When the government collapsed he escaped to Prussia and emigrated to Belgium and studied at the University of Ghent from 1864 under August Kekule until 1867. He worked at the University of Leuven from 1877 and then moved to University of Lviv in 1872 in the department of chemistry and became its head in 1879. He served as dean of the faculty of philosophy in 1872 and rector in 1882. From 1876 he published the journal Cosmos.

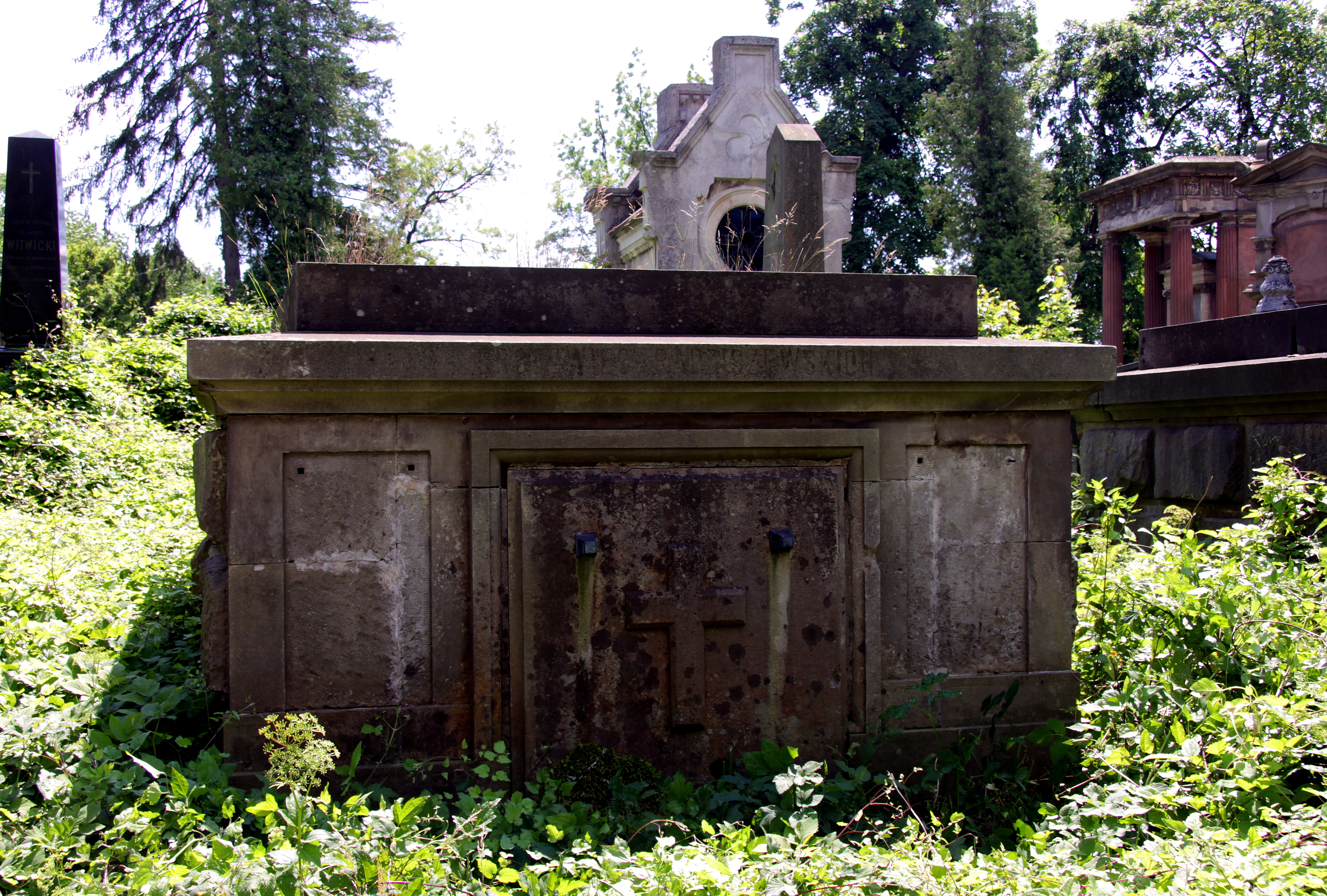
Radziszewski's grave in Lviv

Radziszewski studied mainly aromatic compounds and had a special interest in the chemistry of light production. He studied the chemistry of light production in fireflies. He was also involved in the analysis of water and in studies on petroleum. In 1887 he suggested a theory on the formation of petroleum from organic material through bacterial action. A method for the synthesis of imidazole is named after him. Radziszewski established a Polish school of organic chemists and his students included Stefan Niementowski, K. Kling, Ernest Bandrowski, R. Zuber, M. Dunin-Wąsowicz, and K. Zareleski.

Radziszewski was knighted in the Order of the Iron Crown of the Third Class (1898) and made a councillor in 1909. He was a member of several academic organizations including the Polish Society of Naturalists (which he helped found in 1874 with Feliks Kreutz), and the Galician Pharmacy Society. He retired from the University in 1910 following a decline in his eyesight. He died in Lviv and is buried in the Lychakiv Cemetery.

== See also ==
- List of Polish chemists
- Timeline of Polish science and technology
