= Paul Friedländer (chemist) =

German chemist (1857–1923)

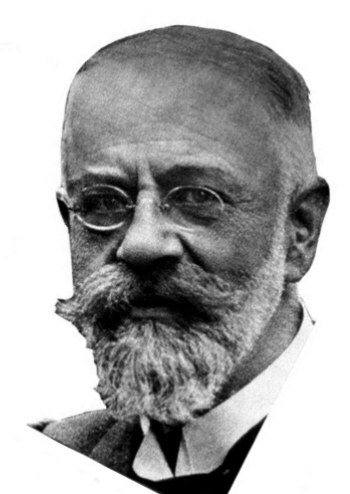
- Born: 29 August 1857; Königsberg, Prussia
- Died: 4 September 1923 (aged 66); Darmstadt, Germany
- Education: Ludwig-Maximilians-Universität München
- Known for: Friedländer synthesis
- Awards: Lieben Prize 1908
- Scientific career
- Fields: organic chemistry
- Workplaces: Technische Universität Darmstadt
- Doctoral advisor: Adolf von Baeyer

Paul Friedländer (29 August 1857 – 4 September 1923) was a German chemist best known for his research on derivates of indigo (for example thioindigo) and isolation of Tyrian purple from Murex brandaris.

== Life and work ==
Paul Friedländer was born the son of Ludwig Friedländer in Königsberg in 1857. The chemist Carl Gräbe was a regular guest of his father; thus after finishing the gymnasium, Friedländer studied chemistry at the University of Königsberg in the laboratories of Gräbe. Later he studied at the University of Strasbourg and the Ludwig-Maximilians-Universität München where he assisted Adolf von Baeyer. He received his PhD for the work with Baeyer and completed his habilitation in 1883. He left the well-equipped laboratories of Baeyer in Munich in 1884 to work in the small company K. Oehler in Offenbach. In 1888, he became professor at the University of Karlsruhe.

During a visit at his parents' in Königsberg, he got engaged and married Martha Kobligk; they had three daughters. Although he liked staying in Germany, Friedländer accepted a position at the Technologische Gewerbemuseum in Vienna in 1895. During that time, he discovered thioindigo. His research on the color variations in substituted indigoes yielded numerous patents and was applied in industrial production. Friedländer isolated and analyzed the natural dyestuff of Tyrian purple. He was able to obtain 12,000 Murex brandaris from biologists working at the Mediterranean Sea. In a complicated process, he isolated 1.4 g of pure Tyrian purple. Contrary to his expectations, the compound did not contain sulfur, but was a bromine substituted indigo, which had been already synthesized back in 1903. Friedlander was awarded the Lieben Prize for this discovery.

In 1911, Friedländer abandoned his position in Vienna and joined the Technische Universität Darmstadt. The University was not far from the dye factories Chemische Fabrik Kalle, Höchst and Cassella that helped Friedländer in his research on dyes. In 1911, he was awarded the Adolf-von-Baeyer-Prize.

During World War I, Friedländer worked at the Kaiser Wilhelm Institute for Physical Chemistry and Elektrochemistry together with Fritz Haber. The poor living standards after the war affected his health, and after a trip from Darmstadt to Biebrich in the summer of 1923, Friedländer had to stay in a hospital. His health problems gradually deteriorated and on 4 September 1923 he died in Darmstadt.

The chemical reaction of 2-aminobenzaldehydes with ketones to form quinoline derivatives, which Friedländer discovered in 1882, is today known as the Friedländer synthesis.
