= Józef Puzyna =

Polish mathematician (1856–1919)

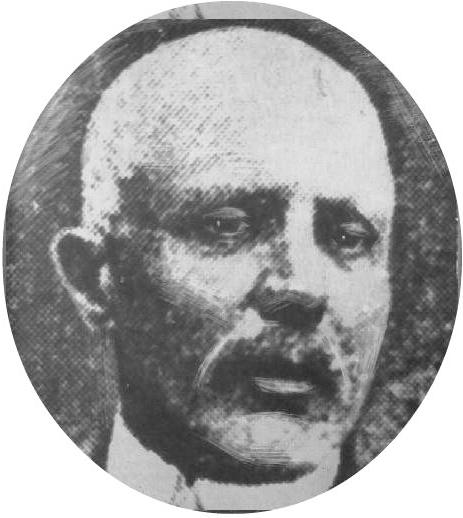
Jozef Puzyna.

Józef Puzyna (April 18, 1856-1919) was a Polish mathematician, recognized as a precursor of the Lwów School of Mathematics.

Puzyna was born in Nowy Martynów, near Rohatyn. He studied at Lvov University under Wawrzyniec Żmurko and at the University of Berlin under Karl Weierstrass, earning his doctorate in 1883. He headed the Department of Mathematics at Lvov University from 1889 until his death in 1919.

His doctoral students included Wladimir Lewicki, who defended his degree in 1901.
