= Wladimir Lewicki =

Ukrainian mathematician (??–1956)

Volodymyr Levytskyi was a Ukrainian mathematician who was the first to publish a mathematical paper in Ukrainian, doing so in 1894. He earned a doctorate in 1901 at Lviv University under Józef Puzyna. Like fellow Ukrainian Mykola Chaikovskyi, Levytskyi worked in Lviv and in high schools. Unlike Chaikovskyi, he maintained close contacts with the Polish Lwów School of Mathematics and published many papers on analytic functions in German.

In 1929, Mykhailo Kravchuk encouraged Levytskyi to emigrate to Ukraine, offering positions either in Kyiv or in Kharkiv, but nothing came out of these efforts. Levytskyi repeatedly denounced the Soviet regime in public. In 1932, he resigned his membership in the Kyiv mathematical society to protest its politicization, which included dismissal of Dmytro Grave as its head. He later resigned from the Soviet Ukrainian Academy of Sciences as well.

Upon Russian occupation of Lviv in 1939, and its subsequent Ukrainization, Levytskyi was appointed as a professor at the Lviv University. After World War II, upon the exodus of Polish mathematicians, he occupied the chair of Stefan Banach and tried to preserve what little remained of the traditions of the Lwów School of Mathematics. He died peacefully in 1956.
