= Cosmos (disambiguation) =

Cosmos generally refers to an orderly or harmonious system.

Cosmos or Kosmos may also refer to:

== Space ==
- Cosmos 1, a privately funded solar sail spacecraft project
- Cosmic Evolution Survey (COSMOS), a Hubble Space Telescope Treasury Project
- Kosmos (rocket family), a series of Soviet/Russian rockets
- Kosmos (satellite), a series of Soviet/Russian satellites
- Universe, synonymous with cosmos
- COSMOS field, an image taken by the Hubble Space Telescope

== Other sciences ==
- Cosmos (plant), a genus of plants in the daisy family
- Cosmos (category theory), a complete and cocomplete symmetric closed monoidal category in mathematics
- COSMOS cohort study, a medical investigation of mobile phone health risks
- California State Summer School for Mathematics and Science

== Places ==
- Cosmos, Minnesota, US
- Cosmos, Rio de Janeiro, a neighborhood of Rio de Janeiro, Brazil
- Kosmos, South Africa, a village in North West Province
- Kosmos, Washington, an unincorporated community in Washington, US

== Literature ==
=== Books ===
- Cosmos (serial novel), a 17-chapter serial novel published in Science Fiction Digest (later Fantasy Magazine) in 1933 - 1934
- Cosmos (Humboldt book), a scientific treatise by Alexander von Humboldt
- Cosmos (Gombrowicz novel), 1965, by Witold Gombrowicz
- Cosmos (Sagan book), 1980, by Carl Sagan based on the documentary series
- The Kosmos Trilogy, a series of philosophy books by Ken Wilber
- Cosmos (Onfray book), 2015, by Michel Onfray

=== Journals ===
- Cosmos (Australian magazine), an Australian popular science magazine
- COSMOS (journal), the scientific journal of the Singapore National Academy of Science
- Cosmos: A Journal of Emerging Issues, an annual essay collection published by the Cosmos Club, 1990–2004
- Cosmos. Problems of Biological Sciences (originally Kosmos. Problemy Nauk Biologicznych), the scientific journal of the Polish Copernicus Society of Naturalists
- Cosmos Science Fiction and Fantasy, a four-issue science fiction magazine edited by David G. Hartwell in 1977
- Kosmos (magazine), a Lithuanian science magazine published in 1920–1940
- Kosmos (Bulgarian magazine), Bulgarian popular science and literary magazine for teenagers

=== Comics ===
- Cosmo, a Fairy Godparent from The Fairly OddParents animated series
- Cosmo, a plant character from the Sonic X animated series
- Cosmos (manga), a manga series
- COSMOS (Spriggan), an organization in the anime Spriggan
- Cosmos (Transformers)
- Cosmos, a character and deity in the video game Dissidia Final Fantasy (2008)
- Cosmos, a supercomputer in the book George's Secret Key to the Universe (2007)
- Kosmos (Marvel Comics)
- KOS-MOS, a Xenosaga character
- Sailor Cosmos, a Sailor Moon character

== Film and TV ==
=== Films ===
- Cosmos (1996 film), a Canadian film
- Cosmos (2010 film), a Turkish film
- Cosmos (2015 film), a French film directed by Andrzej Żuławski, based on the novel by Gombrowicz
- Cosmos (2019 film), a British film

=== Television shows ===
- Cosmos: A Personal Voyage (1980), a 13-part documentary television series presented by Carl Sagan
  - Cosmos: A Spacetime Odyssey (2014), a sequel to Cosmos: A Personal Voyage presented by Neil deGrasse Tyson
  - Cosmos: Possible Worlds (2020), a sequel to Cosmos: A Spacetime Odyssey presented by Neil deGrasse Tyson
- Ultraman Cosmos, a Japanese TV series

== Mass media ==
- ERT Cosmos, a Greek television channel
- PLP (TV channel), formerly known as Cosmos, a local radio and television station serving Elis, southwestern Greece

== Music ==
=== Classical ===
- Cosmos, a 1961 composition for two pianos by Péter Eötvös
- "Cosmus", a 1921–1922 pair of art songs by Carl Nielsen

=== Groups ===
- Cosmos (band), a 2002–2010 Latvian a capella band
- Cosmos, a house music project of DJ Tom Middleton
- Cosmos, a 1980s Japanese jazz fusion group featuring Keiko Doi
- Cosmos, a 2002 Japanese music duo featuring Sachiko M and Ami Yoshida

=== Albums ===
- Cosmos (B.I album) or the title song, 2021
- Cosmos (Buck-Tick album) or the title song, 1996
- Cosmos (Lou Donaldson album), 1971
- Cosmos (McCoy Tyner album) or the title track, 1977
- Cosmos (Rogério Skylab album), 2020
- Cosmos (The Send album), 2007
- Cosmos (Sun Ra album) or the title track, 1977
- Cosmos (Zombi album), 2004
- Cosmos, by Yuji Ohno, 1981
- K.O.S.M.O.S., by Valensia, 1996

=== Songs ===
- "Cosmos", by Tom Middleton, 2002
- "Kosmos" (song), by Antic Cafe, 2004
- "Cosmos", by Paul Epworth from Voyager, 2020
- "Kosmos", by Paul Weller from Paul Weller, 1992
- "Cosmos", by Will Sergeant, 1995

== Companies ==
- Cos.Mo.S, an Italian firm who made swimmer delivery vehicles for frogmen to ride
- Cosmos, a coach company, part of Globus family of brands
- Cosmos Books, an imprint of Wildside Press
- Cosmos Holidays, UK independent tour operator
- Kosmos (company), a Norwegian shipping company
- Kosmos (publisher), a publisher of books, toys and games
- Kosmos Airlines, a Russian airline
- Kosmos Energy, an oil company

== Computing and technology ==
- Azure Cosmos DB, a database by Microsoft, previously called DocumentDB
- Cosmos (operating system), a framework aimed for creating .NET (mostly C#)-based operating systems
- Atari Cosmos, a game system
- COSMOS (telecommunications), a distribution frame record-keeping system
- COS/MOS, a family of integrated circuits
- COSMOS, a molecular modelling software package
- Cosmos, developer of a database based on the Pick operating system
- Lucid Cosmos, a battery electric mid-size SUV

== Sport ==
- New York Cosmos (1970–85), an American soccer club based in New York City
- New York Cosmos (2013–2020), an American soccer club based in New York City
- New York Cosmos (2026), an American soccer club based in Paterson, New Jersey
- AM Cosmos Ljubljana, a Slovenian football club from 1992 to 1993; since renamed to NK Ljubljana
- Canberra Cosmos FC, a former Australian football based in Canberra
- Cosmos de Bafia, a Cameroonian football club based in Bafia
- Jomo Cosmos F.C., a South African football club based in Johannesburg
- OR Tambo Cosmos, a South African football club based in Mthatha
- S.S. Cosmos, a Sanmarinese football club
- Umbelebele Jomo Cosmos F.C., a Swazi football club based in Mbabane
- Cosmos FK, a Swedish football club based in Östersund

== Other uses ==
- Kosmos (political party), a Greek political party
- Cosmos (standard), certification requirements for organic and natural cosmetics in Europe
- International Cosmos Prize
- USC&GS Cosmos, an American survey ship
- Cosmos Nickel Mine, a mine in Western Australia
- Oshan Cosmos, a minivan produced by Changan Oshan
- Kosmos (video game), a 1994 game by L.K. Avalon

== See also ==
- Cosmic (disambiguation)
- Cosmo (disambiguation)
