= Feliks Kreutz =

Polish geologist and educator (1844–1910)

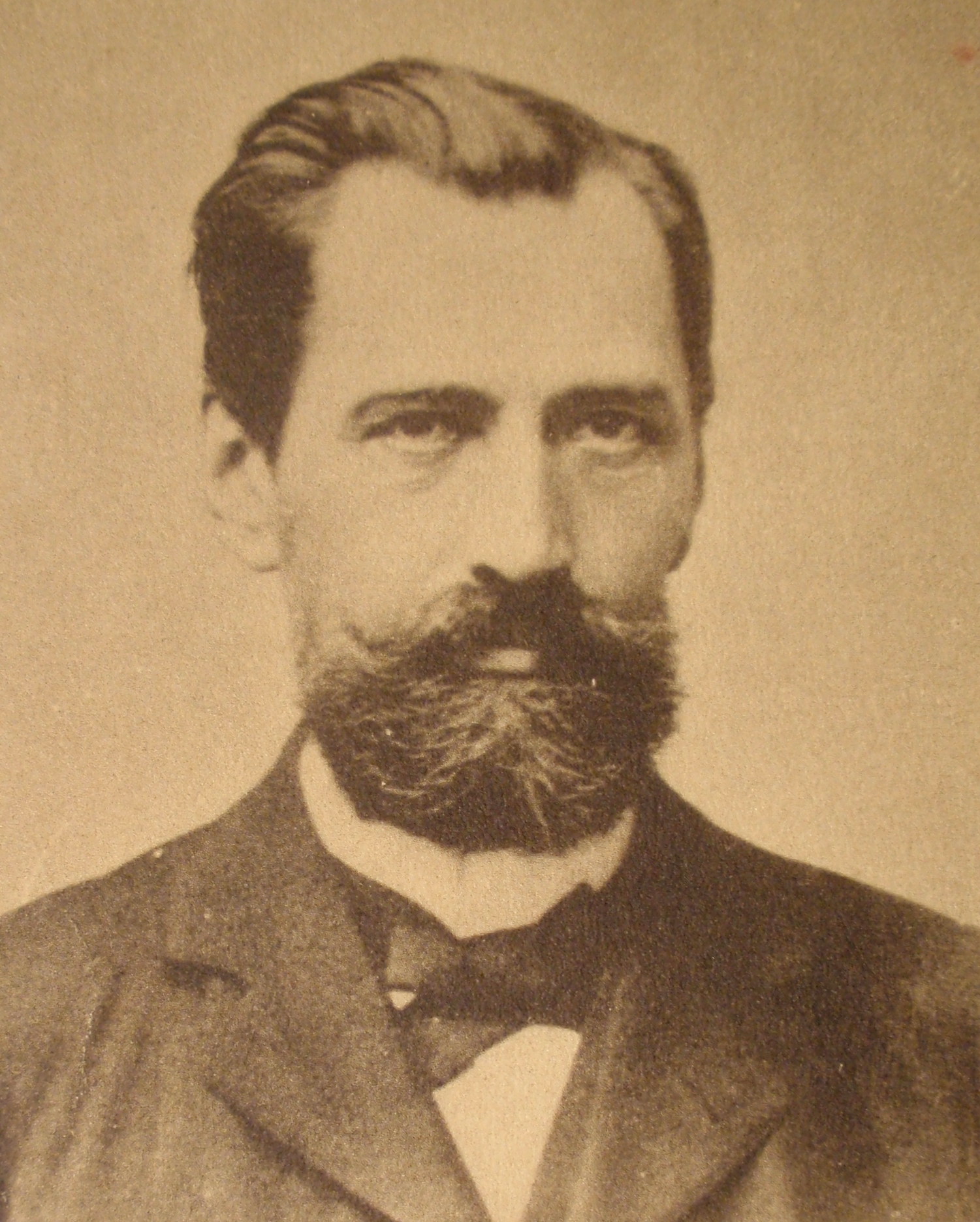
- Born: 19 November 1844; Neu Sandez, Habsburg Empire
- Died: 22 September 1910 (aged 65); Zakopane, Habsburg Empire
- Education: Lviv University
- Occupations: geologist, politician

Feliks Franz Xaver Kreutz (19 November 1844 – 22 September 1910) was a Polish geologist, mineralogist and rector of the Jagiellonian University from 1896 to 1897.

He was born at Nowy Sącz (then Neu-Sandez in Galicia, part of the Habsburg Empire), and after studying at Lviv (Lemberg), Kraków (Krakau) and Vienna, was attached during 1867–1868 to the Austrian Geological Survey. In 1875, he founded the Polish Copernicus Society of Naturalists. He was successively Professor of Mineralogy in the High School and the University of Lemberg (Lviv University), and the Jagellonian University at Kraków. From the last post he retired in 1908, his successor being Professor Józef Morozewicz, to whom his son, Stefan Kreutz, was an assistant. He was a member of the Polish Academy of Sciences, and for a time director of its mathematical and natural sciences section.

Kreutz was the author of several geological, petrographical, and mineralogical papers. Of the latter may be mentioned his work on the colour, fluorescence, and phosphorescence of rock-salt and fluorspar, and their alteration under the influence of the cathode rays, sodium vapour, and changes of temperature.
