= Wszechświat =

Polish popular-science magazine

Wszechświat (The Universe)
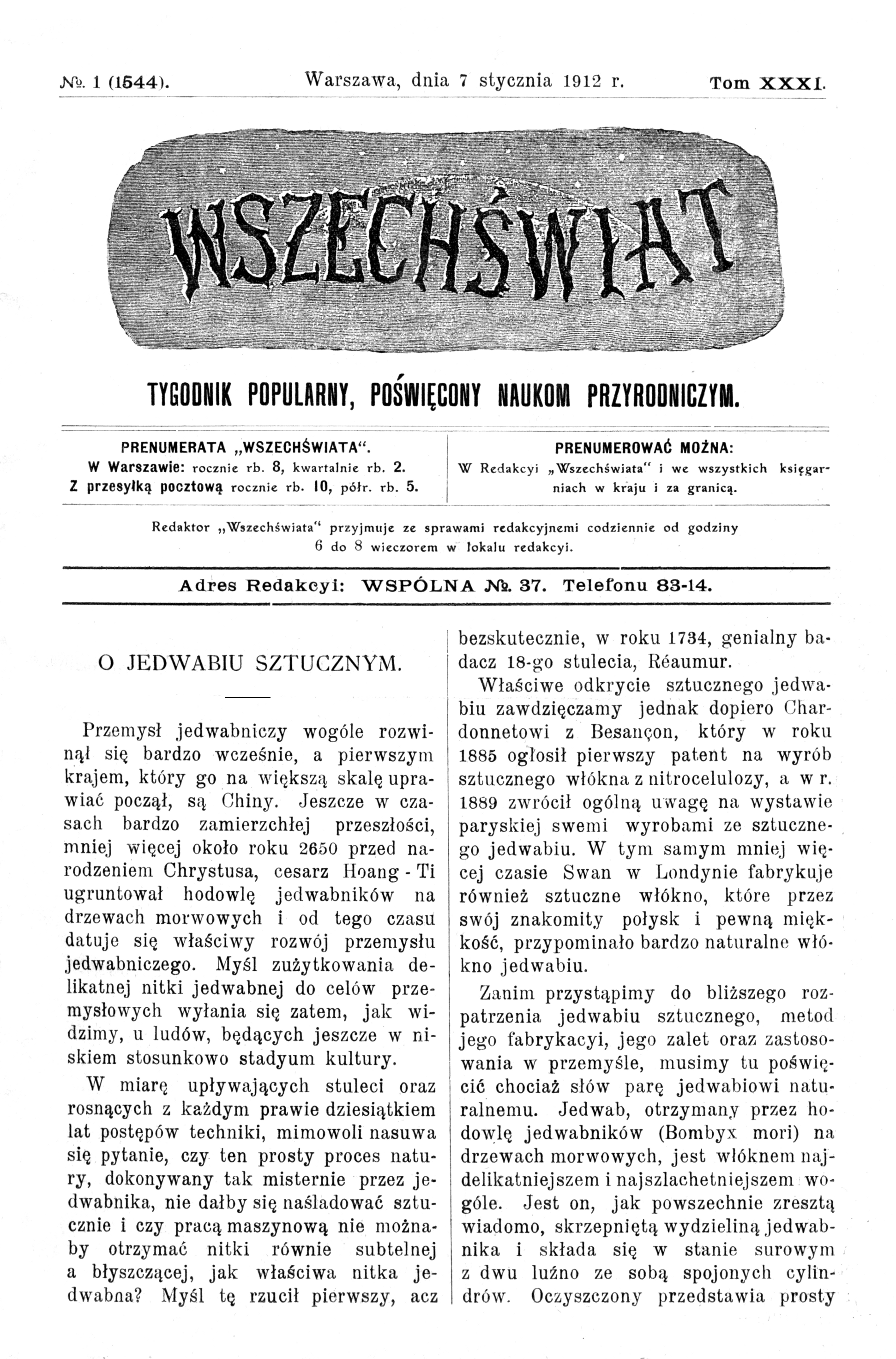
- Wszechświat front page from January 7, 1912
- Publisher: Polish Copernicus Society of Naturalists
- Editor: Maria Śmiałowska
- Founded: 1882
- Language: Polish
- Headquarters: Kraków, Podwale 1
- Website: wszechswiat.agh.edu.pl

Wszechświat (Polish pronunciation: [ˈfʂɛx.ɕfjat], "The Universe") is a Polish popular-science magazine, currently issued as quarterly by Polish Copernicus Society of Naturalists, supported by AGH University of Science and Technology and Polish Academy of Learning.

== History ==
Wszechświat was founded in 1882 as a biweekly, initiators were students and teachers of The Main School in Warsaw. First editor-in-chief of the magazine was chemist Bronisław Znatowicz. He was leading the journal for many years. In 1914, when World War I began, Wszechświat was closed and Znatowicz left.

The magazine was reactivated as a monthly in 1927. Since 1929 the editor-in-chief was the biologist Jan Bohdan Dembowski. In 1930, in the result of Dembowski's activity, Polish Copernicus Society of Naturalists took mastership over Wszechświat and in 1934 editorial office was moved to Vilnius. In 1939 the journal was closed again because of World War II.

It was brought back to life by geologist Kazimierz Maślankiewicz and zoologist Zygmunt Grodziński in 1945 in Kraków. Since 1981 until 2002 the editor-in-chief was Jerzy Vetulani.

Nowadays the whole title is 'Wszechświat. Pismo Przyrodnicze' (the English translation: The Universe. Magazine of Nature).

== See also ==
- Kosmos. Problemy Nauk Biologicznych (eng. Cosmos. Problems of Biological Sciences)
