= Heinrich Debus =

German chemist (1824–1915)

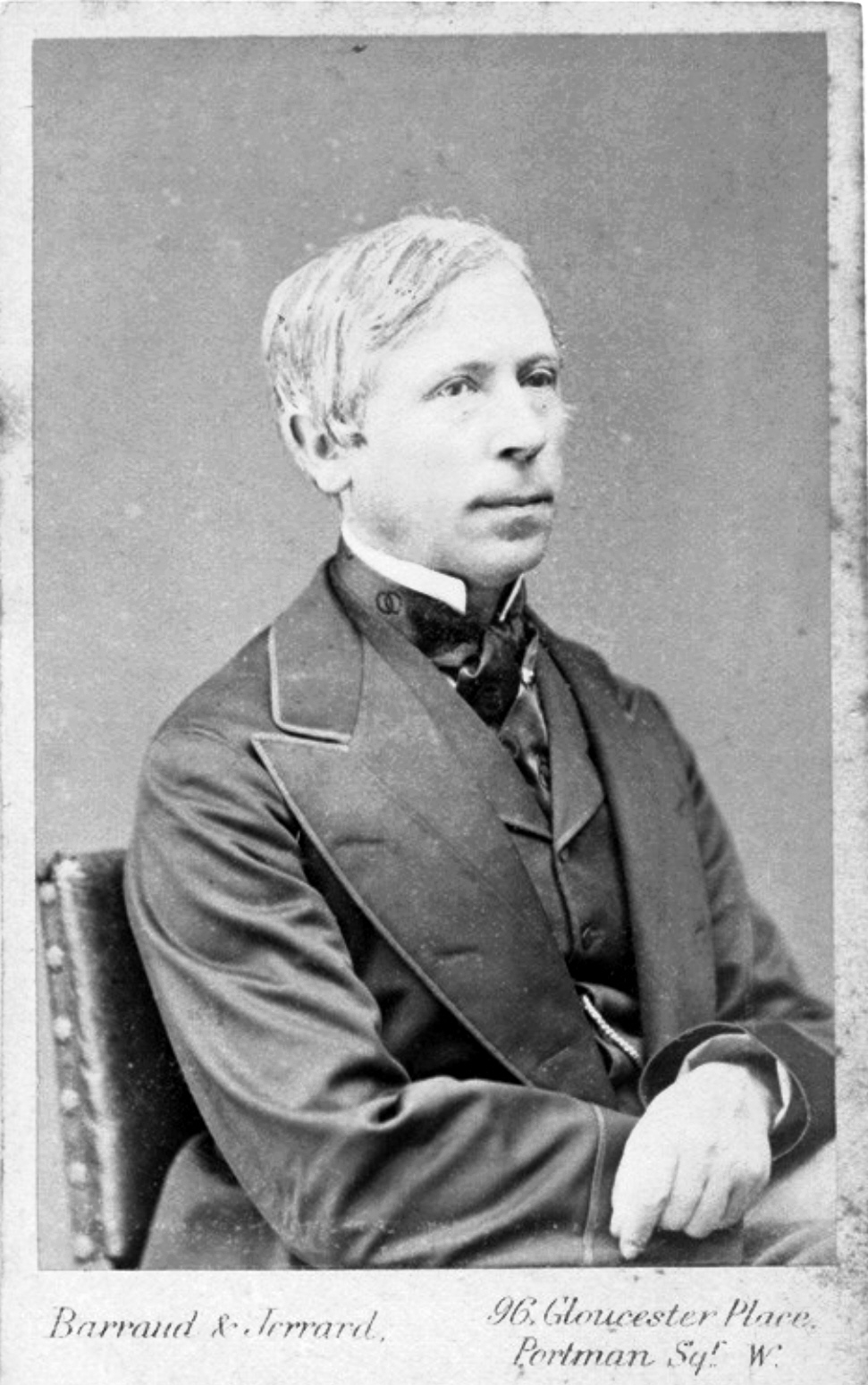
Debus in 1872

Heinrich Debus, Obituary

Heinrich Debus (13 July 1824 – 9 December 1915) was a German chemist.

== Education and career ==
In 1838, he attended a trade school in Kassel, where he was taught by Robert Wilhelm Bunsen. He studied chemistry from 1845 to 1848 in Marburg, and served as Bunsen's assistant from 1847. In 1848, he earned his doctorate by investigating a red madder dye. He completed his habilitation in 1851 after Bunsen left for Breslau. At the suggestion of Frederick Augustus Genth, Debus was named Bunsen's successor at Marburg.

Later in 1851 he left for England to be a chemistry teacher at Queenwood College followed from 1868 to 1870 by the position as Science Master at Clifton College, Bristol. He then taught at Guy's Hospital, London from 1870 until appointed foundation Professor of Chemistry in 1873 at the new Royal Naval College, Greenwich, where he remained until his retirement and return to Germany.

In 1858, Debus first synthesized imidazole from glyoxal, ammonia, and formaldehyde. The Debus synthesis was later often commented by the Polish chemist Bronisław Leonard Radziszewski. Therefore, this reaction is sometimes called "Radziszewski reaction".

He was elected a Fellow of the Royal Society in 1861 and in 1894 he was awarded honorary membership of the Manchester Literary and Philosophical Society,
