= Stefan Niementowski =

Polish chemist (1866–1925)

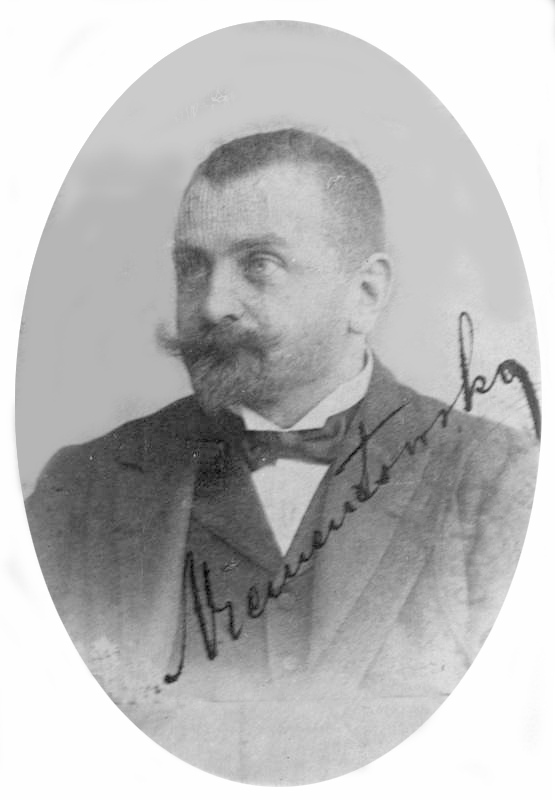
- Stefan Niementowski
- Born: August 4, 1866; Zhovkva, Poland now Ukraine
- Died: July 13, 1925 (aged 58); Warsaw, Poland
- Known for: Niementowski quinoline synthesis Niementowski quinazoline synthesis
- Scientific career
- Doctoral advisor: Bronisław Radziszewski

Stefan Niementowski (August 4, 1866 – July 13, 1925 was a Polish chemist. He discovered the Niementowski quinoline synthesis and the Niementowski quinazoline synthesis. He was a president of Polish Copernicus Society of Naturalists (1920–22).
