= Polish Copernicus Society of Naturalists =

Scientific society in Poland

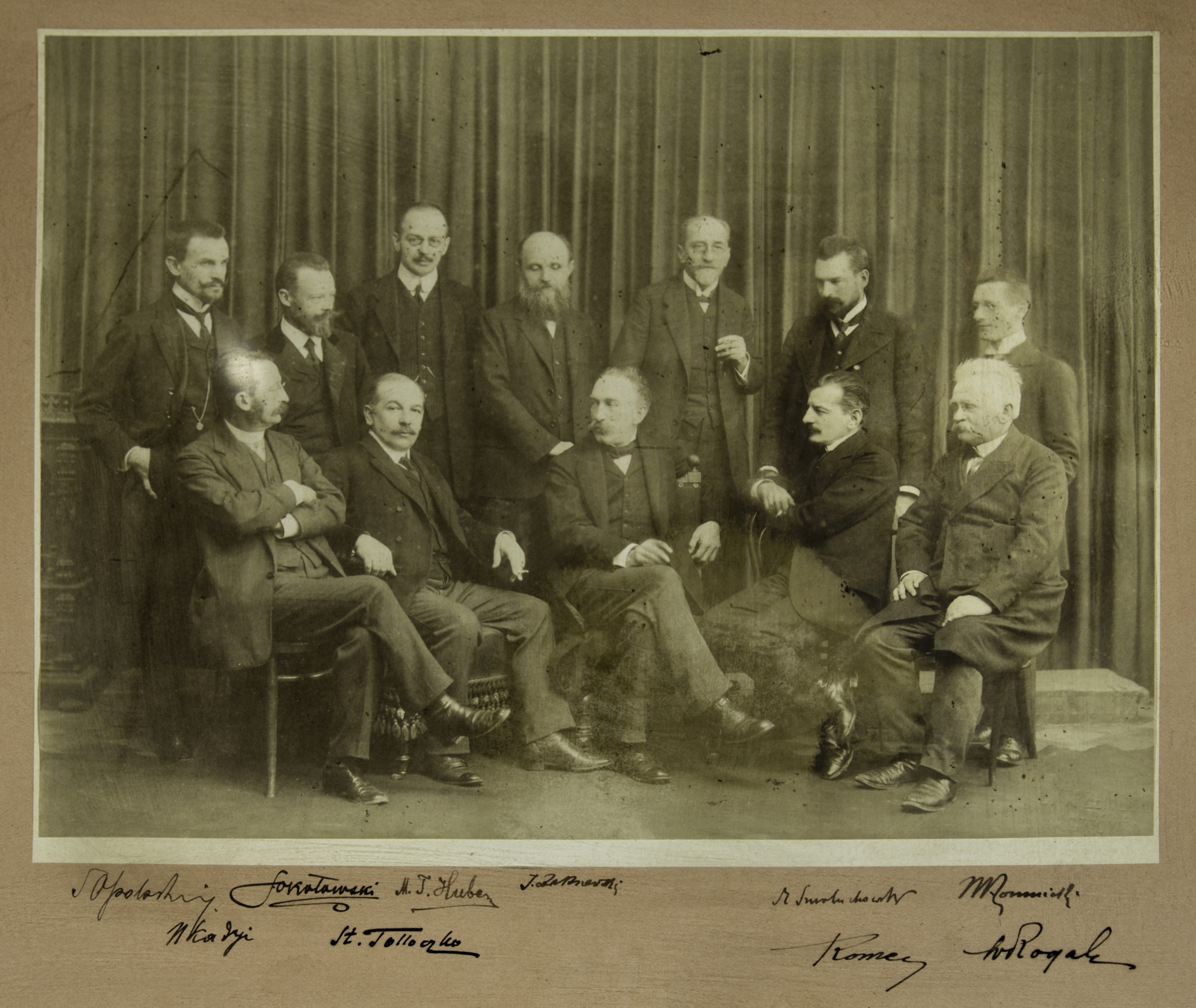
Members of the Polish Copernicus Society of Naturalists, c. 1910. Under the photograph there are signatures of the members, among which are the ones of Henryk Kadyi (sitting first from the left), Stanisław Sokołowski (sitting second from the left), Eugeniusz Romer (sitting second from the right), Marian Łomnicki (sitting first from the right), Marian Smoluchowski (standing second from the right), Ignacy Zakrzewski and Stanisław Tołłoczko.

The Polish Copernicus Society of Naturalists (Polish: Polskie Towarzystwo Przyrodników im. Kopernika) is a Polish scientific society for natural sciences researchers.

== History ==
The society was founded in 1875 in Lviv on the initiative of natural sciences researchers in Lviv under the leadership of Feliks Kreutz (geologist), Bronisław Radziszewski (chemist) and Julian Niedźwiedzki (mineralogist and geologist). The first president was Feliks Kreutz, professor of mineralogy at the Lviv University. The name of the society commemorates Nicolaus Copernicus.

The society is a non-profit organization. Its main aim is to promote research and achievements of natural sciences. The area of interest is mainly biology (including neuroscience), medicine, physics, chemistry, geography, geology (including speleology), meteorology and science education. The society organizes scientific and popular scientific conferences, e.g. Brain Awareness Week (in Kraków and Szczecin), and the Biological Olympiad, a competition for Polish high school students. It publishes two journals: from 1876 'Kosmos. Problemy Nauk Biologicznych' (the title in English translation: Cosmos. Problems of Biological Sciences) and since 1882 'Wszechświat. Pismo Przyrodnicze' (the title in English: The Universe. Magazine of Nature).

The main board of the society is located in Kraków. It has six local branches in Kraków, Łódź, Wrocław, Szczecin, Lublin and Rzeszów.

There are three sections:

- Section of Speleology - the section for scientific studies of Polish caves (website of the section)
- Section of Biology Education - the section for didactics of biology
- Section of Human Biology - the interdisciplinary section for human biology, medicine and humanities (website of the section)

== Presidents of the Society ==
- Feliks Kreutz (1875–76, 1884–85),
- Bronisław Radziszewski (1877–78, 1890–91),
- Wawrzyniec Żmurko (1879–81),
- Oskar Fabian (1882–83),
- Benedykt Dybowski (1886–87),
- Rudolf Zuber (1888–89, 1898–99, 1918–19),
- Emil Dunikowski (1892–93),
- Henryk Kadyi (1894–95),
- Marian Łomnicki (1896–97),
- Ignacy Zakrzewski (1900–01),
- Józef Nusbaum (1902–03),
- Marian Raciborski (1904–05),
- Marian Smoluchowski (1906–07),
- Tadeusz Wiśniowski (1908–09),
- Eugeniusz Romer (1910–11),
- Stanisław Sokołowski (1912, 1914–17),
- Stanisław Tołłoczko (1913),
- Stefan Niementowski (1920–22),
- Jan Czekanowski (1923–24),
- Jan Hirschler (1925–26),
- Julian Tokarski (1927–32, 1939, 1945–46),
- Dezydery Szymkiewicz (1933–38),
- Wojciech Rogala (1946–47),
- Gustaw Poluszyński (1947–52),
- Kazimierz Petrusewicz (1952–59),
- Kazimierz Maślankiewicz (1959–1981),
- Adam Urbanek (1981–1982),
- Kazimierz Matusiak (1982–1991),
- Henryk Sander (1991–1995),
- Wiesław Krzemiński (1995–1998),
- Barbara Płytycz (1998–2001),
- Elżbieta Pyza (2001– ).
