= Friedländer synthesis =

Chemical reaction

Named after	Paul Friedländer
Reaction type	Ring forming reaction

Identifiers
Organic Chemistry Portal	friedlaender-synthesis

The Friedländer synthesis is a chemical reaction of 2-aminobenzaldehydes with ketones to form quinoline derivatives. It is named after German chemist Paul Friedländer (1857–1923).

The Friedländer synthesis

This reaction has been catalyzed by trifluoroacetic acid, toluenesulfonic acid, iodine, and Lewis acids.

Several reviews have been published.

== Mechanism ==
Two viable reaction mechanisms exist for this reaction. In the first mechanism 2-amino substituted carbonyl compound 1 and carbonyl compound 2 react in a rate-limiting step to aldol adduct 3. This intermediate loses water in an elimination reaction to unsaturated carbonyl compound 4 and then loses water again in imine formation to quinoline 7. In the second mechanism the first step is Schiff base formation to 5 followed by Aldol reaction to 6 and elimination to 7.

The Pfitzinger reaction and the Niementowski quinoline synthesis are variations of the Friedländer reaction.

== See also ==
- Doebner-Miller reaction
- Povarov reaction
- Skraup reaction
