= Template reaction =

In chemistry, a template reaction is any of a class of ligand-based reactions that occur between two or more adjacent coordination sites on a metal center. In the absence of the metal ion, the same organic reactants produce different products. The term is mainly used in coordination chemistry. The template effects emphasizes the pre-organization provided by the coordination sphere, although the coordination modifies the electronic properties (acidity, electrophilicity, etc.) of ligands.

An early example is the dialkylation of a nickel dithiolate:

The corresponding alkylation in the absence of a metal ion would yield polymers. Crown ethers arise from dialkylations that are templated by alkali metals. Other template reactions include the Mannich and Schiff base condensations. The condensation of formaldehyde, ammonia, and tris(ethylenediamine)cobalt(III) to give a clathrochelate complex is one example.

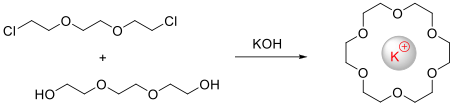
18-Crown-6 can be synthesized by the Williamson ether synthesis using potassium ion as the template cation.

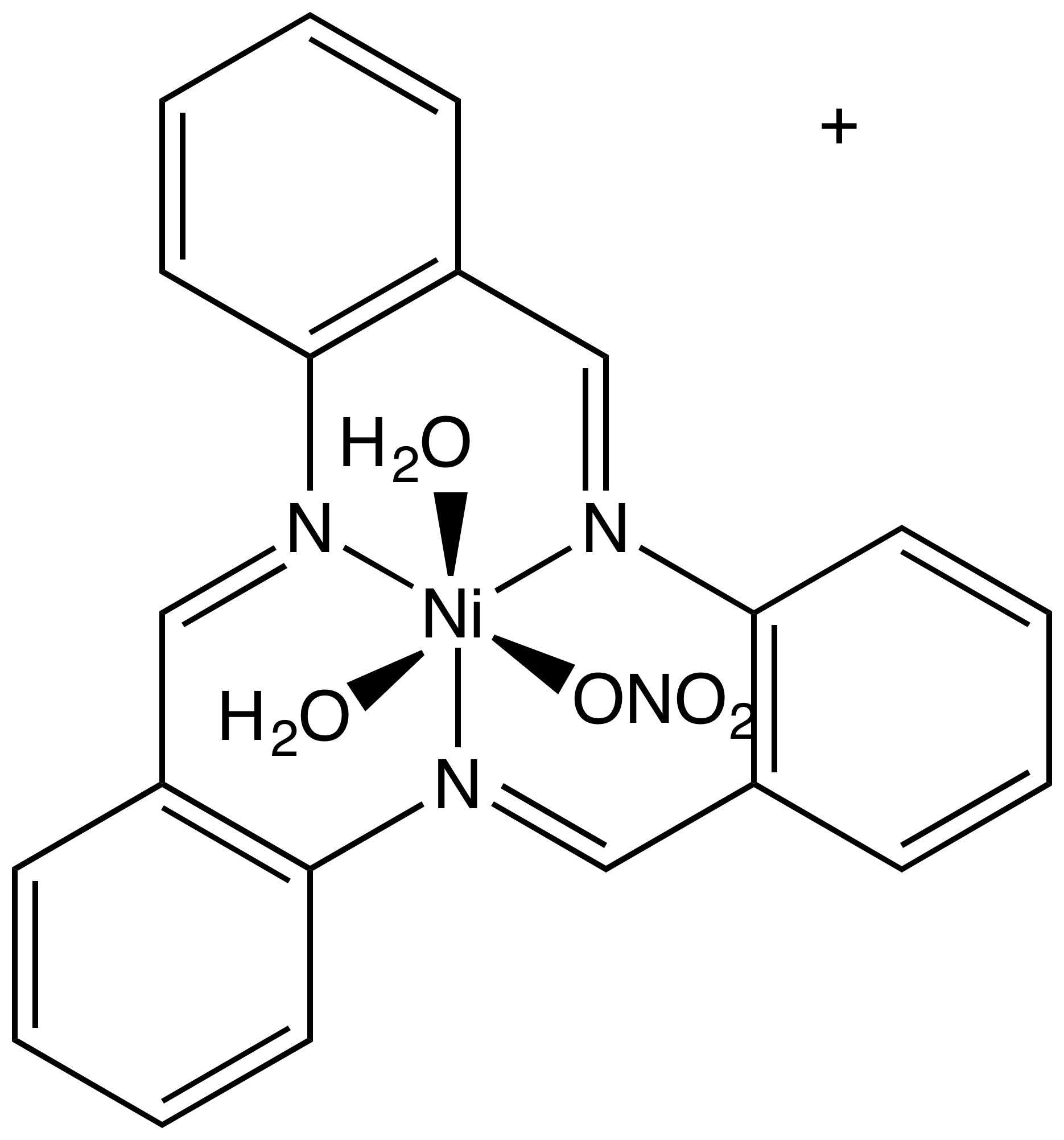
Structure of nickel-aquo nitrate complex of the ligand derived from the templated trimerization of 2-aminobenzaldehyde.

The phosphorus analogue of an aza crown can be prepared by a template reaction. Where it is not possible to isolate the phosphine itself.

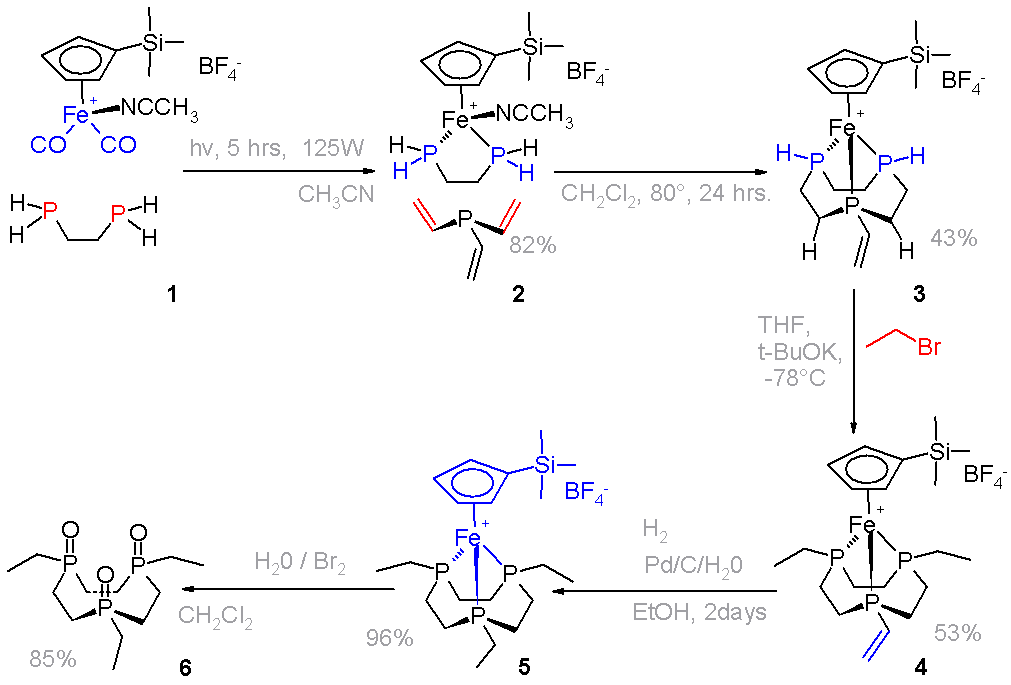
Scheme 4. Phosphacrown

== Limitations ==
Many template reactions are only stoichiometric, and the decomplexation of the "templating ion" can be difficult. The alkali metal-templated syntheses of crown ether syntheses are notable exceptions. Metal Phthalocyanines are generated by metal-templated condensations of phthalonitriles, but the liberation of metal-free phthalocyanine is difficult.

Some so-called template reactions proceed similarly in the absence of the templating ion. One example being the condensation of acetone and ethylenediamine, which yields isomeric 14-membered tetraaza rings. Similarly, porphyrins, which feature 16-membered central rings, form in the absence of metal templates.

14-membered N4 macrocyclic ligands, called Curtis macrocycles, arise from the condensation of acetone and a nickel complex of ethylenediamine.

== Concept in catalysis ==
In a general sense, transition metal-based catalysis can be viewed as template reactions: Reactants coordinate to adjacent sites on the metal ion and, owing to their adjacency, the two reactants interconnect (insert or couple) either directly or via the action of another reagent. In the area of homogeneous catalysis, the cyclo-oligomerization of acetylene to cyclooctatetraene at a nickel(II) centre reflects the templating effect of the nickel, where it is supposed that four acetylene molecules occupy four sites around the metal and react simultaneously to give the product. This simplistic mechanistic hypotheses was influential in the development of these catalytic reactions. For example, if a competing ligand such as triphenylphosphine were added to occupy one coordination site, then only three molecules of acetylene could bind, and these come together to form benzene (see Reppe chemistry).
