= 4-Methylimidazole =

Names
- Preferred IUPAC name 4-Methyl-1H-imidazole

Identifiers
CAS Number	822-36-6
3D model (JSmol)	Interactive image
ChEBI	CHEBI:40035
ChemSpider	12640
ECHA InfoCard	100.011.361
PubChem CID	13195
UNII	Q64GF9FV4I
CompTox Dashboard (EPA)	DTXSID9025617
- InChI: InChI=1S/C4H6N2/c1-4-2-5-3-6-4/h2-3H,1H3,(H,5,6) Key: XLSZMDLNRCVEIJ-UHFFFAOYSA-N; InChI=1/C4H6N2/c1-4-2-5-3-6-4/h2-3H,1H3,(H,5,6) Key: XLSZMDLNRCVEIJ-UHFFFAOYAA
- SMILES: [nH]1cc(nc1)C

Properties
Chemical formula	C_{4}H_{6}N_{2}
Molar mass	82.106 g·mol^{−1}
Appearance	Slightly yellowish solid
Density	1.02 g/cm^{3}
Melting point	46 to 48 °C (115 to 118 °F; 319 to 321 K)
Boiling point	263 °C (505 °F; 536 K)

Hazards
Flash point	157 °C (315 °F; 430 K)
- Except where otherwise noted, data are given for materials in their standard state (at 25 °C [77 °F], 100 kPa). verify (what is ?) Infobox references

4-Methylimidazole (4-MeI or 4-MEI) is a heterocyclic organic chemical compound with molecular formula H_{3}C–C_{3}H_{3}N_{2} or C_{4}H_{6}N_{2}. It is formally derived from imidazole through replacement of the hydrogen in position 4 by a methyl group. It is a slightly yellowish solid.

4-MeI may be formed in the browning of certain foods through the Maillard reaction between carbohydrates and amino-containing compounds. In particular, it is found in roasted foods, grilled meats, coffee and in types of caramel coloring produced with ammonia-based processes. It may arise also by fermentation.

== Preparation and structure ==
4-MeI may be prepared using the Debus-Radziszewski imidazole synthesis, by reacting methylglyoxal with ammonia and formaldehyde. It may also be prepared by the reaction of hydroxyacetone and formamide in ammonia.

Small energy difference separates 4-methylimidazole from its tautomer 5-methylimidazole.

== Safety ==
=== Carcinogenicity studies ===
Concern has arisen about the presence of 4-MeI in caramel color (which is the most-used food and beverage coloring), typically at a concentration between 50 and 700 ppm. Dark beers and common brands of cola drinks may contain more than 100 μg of this compound per 12-ounce serving, i.e. 300ppm.

At very high doses (360 mg/kg of body weight), 4-MeI is a convulsant for rabbits, mice and chicks, and was the likely cause of acute intoxication observed in cattle fed with ammoniated, sugar-containing cattle feed supplements in the 1960s. However, several studies found no ill effect in rats and dogs for the concentrations found in caramel coloring. For an average weighted person (68 kg) to receive a 360 mg/kg dose from consuming dark beer or cola drinks, they would have to consume approximately 244,800 12-oz drinks.

A 2007 study by the United States National Toxicology Program (NTP) examined carcinogenic activity following long-term exposure to 4-Mel, and found clear evidence for lung tumors in mice, limited evidence for increased leukemia in female rats, and no evidence in male rats.

=== Regulatory response ===
The United States Food and Drug Administration has stated that it has "no reason to believe that there is any immediate or short term danger presented by 4-MeI at levels expected in food from the use of caramel coloring". The Agency describes the NTP carcinogenicity study as having been conducted at doses that "far exceed" current estimates of human exposure from the consumption of caramel coloring in foods and soft drinks. The Agency has stated that it is reviewing current exposure levels but does not recommend consumers change their diets based on concerns about 4-MeI. In response to statements by the Center for Science in the Public Interest that levels of 4-MeI in soft drinks "needlessly expose consumers to a chemical that causes cancer", an FDA spokesperson stated "[a] person would have to drink more than a thousand cans of soda in a day to match the doses administered in studies that showed links to cancer in rodents."

The European Food Safety Authority (EFSA) reviewed the safety of caramel colorings in 2011 and revised the previously established Acceptable Daily Intakes for these products for reasons unrelated to 4-MeI exposure. The Administration's review concluded that there is no evidence to show that caramel colors have any adverse effect on human reproduction. The review further concluded that the highest level of 4-MeI that could result from the consumption of foods containing caramel colors are not of concern.

Health Canada has stated that 4-MeI levels found in foods do not represent a risk.

The Hong Kong Centre for Food Safety has stated that based on levels of 4-MeI found in soft drinks, a person would have to consume over 300 cans of soda each day to reach the doses found to cause cancer in the NFT study, after adjusting for a 100-fold uncertainty factor.

In January 2011, California added 4-MeI to its list of probable carcinogens and stipulated 29 μg per day as the "No Significant Risk Level" intake. Studies have found levels of up to 700 μg per liter in cola soft drinks, up to 1450 μg per liter in coffee, and up to 28,030 μg/liter in dark beer.

The non-profit Center for Science in the Public Interest has petitioned the FDA to require the removal of methylimidazole containing caramel colors from soft drinks.

In March 2012, both The Coca-Cola Company and PepsiCo announced they had their caramel color suppliers modify their manufacturing processes to meet the new California standard; as of the announcement, the changes had already been made for beverages sold in California. The recipe is not changing in Europe, so the 4-MeI level will remain the same. Similarly, Pepsi and some Coke lots sold in the states other than California in the United States contain 4-MeI levels considered safe by the FDA and EFSA, but exceeding California standards. In 2016 PepsiCo lost The Pepsi Carcinogen Class Action Lawsuit Stacy Sciortino, et al. v. Pepsico Inc., Case No. 3:14-cv-00478, in the U.S. District Court for the Northern District of California. This affects all PepsiCo products shipped for sale within the United States.

== See also ==
- 1-Methylimidazole
- 2-Methylimidazole
