= Cosmos (journal) =

- Discipline: Interdisciplinary
- Language: English
- Edited by: A. Wee Thye Shen

Publication details
- History: 2005-present
- Publisher: World Scientific (Singapore)
- Frequency: biannually

Standard abbreviations
- ISO 4: Cosmos

Indexing
- ISSN: 0219-6077 (print); 1793-7051 (web)

Links
- Journal homepage; Online access; RSS

COSMOS is the scientific journal of the Singapore National Academy of Science. It is published twice annually by World Scientific and covers interdisciplinary research in Science and Mathematics.

== See also ==
- Cosmos. Problems of Biological Sciences
- Cosmos magazine
