= Niementowski quinazoline synthesis =

Chemical reaction

Named after	Stefan Niementowski
Reaction type	Ring forming reaction

The Niementowski quinazoline synthesis is the chemical reaction of anthranilic acids with amides to form 4-oxo-3,4-dihydroquinazolines (3H-quinazolin-4-ones).

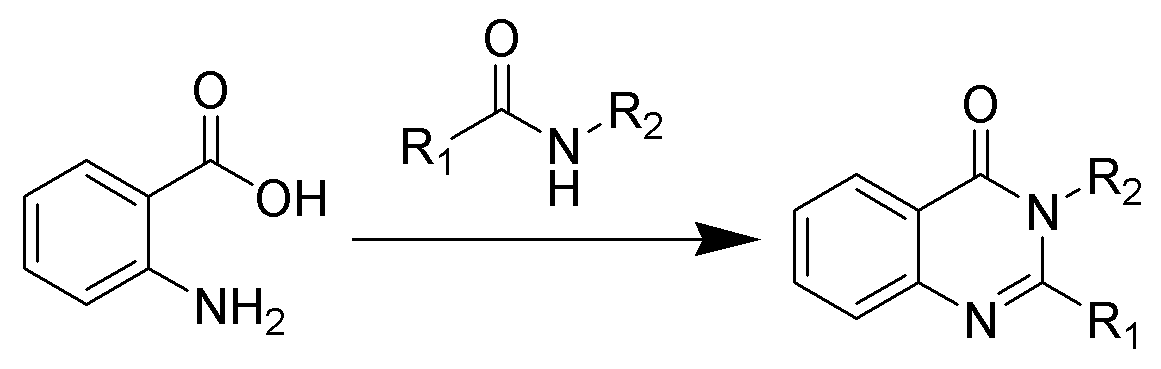
The Niementowski quinazoline synthesis

== Uses ==
Research has demonstrated that the Niementowski quinazoline synthesis could be employed for the creation of potential EGFR-inhibiting molecules. Hensbergen et al. have shown a synthetic route to a new class of privileged tri- and tetra-cyclic quinazolines containing a medium-sized ring.

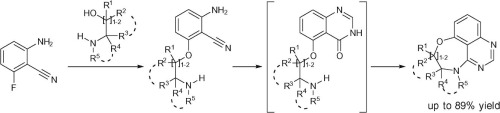

A nucleophilic aromatic substitution is combined with the Niementowski reaction and a BOP-mediated ring closure to afford several analogues.
