= Ivan Krypiakevych Institute of Ukrainian Studies =

Ukrainian research institute

- Інститут українознавства імені І. Крип'якевича НАН України
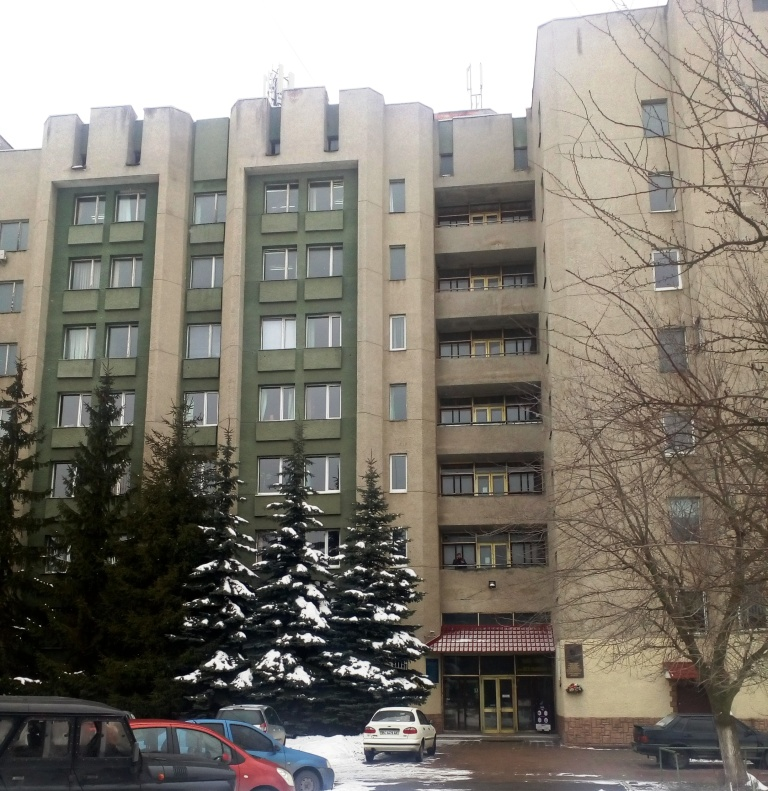
- Formation: 1951
- Type: Research Institute
- Headquarters: 4 Kozelnytska Street, Lviv
- Location: Ukraine
- Parent organization: National Academy of Sciences of Ukraine
- Website: www.inst-ukr.lviv.ua

The Ivan Krypiakevych Institute of Ukrainian Studies (Ukrainian: Інститут українознавства імені І. Крип'якевича) is a specialized research institution of the National Academy of Sciences of Ukraine located in Lviv. It focuses on the history, language, and culture of Ukraine.

== History ==
The institute was established in 1951 through the merger of several Lviv-based departments of the Academy of Sciences. It continues the traditions of the Shevchenko Scientific Society research centers that operated in Lviv before 1939. In 1993, it was named after the prominent Ukrainian historian Ivan Krypiakevych, who served as its director in the 1950s.

== Research and Publications ==
The institute comprises departments dedicated to archaeology, history, and philology. It is known for publishing significant academic series and journals, including:

- Ukraine: Cultural Heritage, National Consciousness, Statehood (Ukrainian: Україна: культурна спадщина, національна свідомість, державність).
- Numerous monographs on the history of the Galician-Volhynian Principality and the history of Western Ukraine.
