= 2-Aminobenzaldehyde =

Names
- Preferred IUPAC name 2-Aminobenzaldehyde
- Other names ortho-Aminobenzaldehyde; 2-Formylaniline; 2-Aminobenzenecarbaldehyde

Identifiers
CAS Number	529-23-7
3D model (JSmol)	Interactive image
ChemSpider	61553
ECHA InfoCard	100.007.687
EC Number	208-454-3
PubChem CID	68255
UNII	EG769PG2AX
CompTox Dashboard (EPA)	DTXSID6060183
- InChI: InChI=1S/C7H7NO/c8-7-4-2-1-3-6(7)5-9/h1-5H,8H2 Key: FXWFZIRWWNPPOV-UHFFFAOYSA-N
- SMILES: C1=CC=C(C(=C1)C=O)N

Properties
Chemical formula	C_{7}H_{7}NO
Molar mass	121.139 g·mol^{−1}
Appearance	yellow solid
Melting point	32–34 °C (90–93 °F; 305–307 K)
Solubility in water	good
- Except where otherwise noted, data are given for materials in their standard state (at 25 °C [77 °F], 100 kPa). Infobox references

2-Aminobenzaldehyde is an organic compound with the formula C_{6}H_{4}(NH_{2})CHO. It is one of three isomers of aminobenzaldehyde. It is a low-melting yellow solid that is soluble in water.

== Preparation and reactions ==
It is usually prepared by reduction of 2-nitrobenzaldehyde with iron or iron(II) sulfate. Like related aminoaldehydes, it is unstable with respect to self-condensation.

2-Aminobenzaldehyde is used to prepare quinolines by the Friedländer synthesis:

The Friedländer synthesis

By template reactions, it also forms trimeric and tetrameric condensation products that have been studied as ligands.

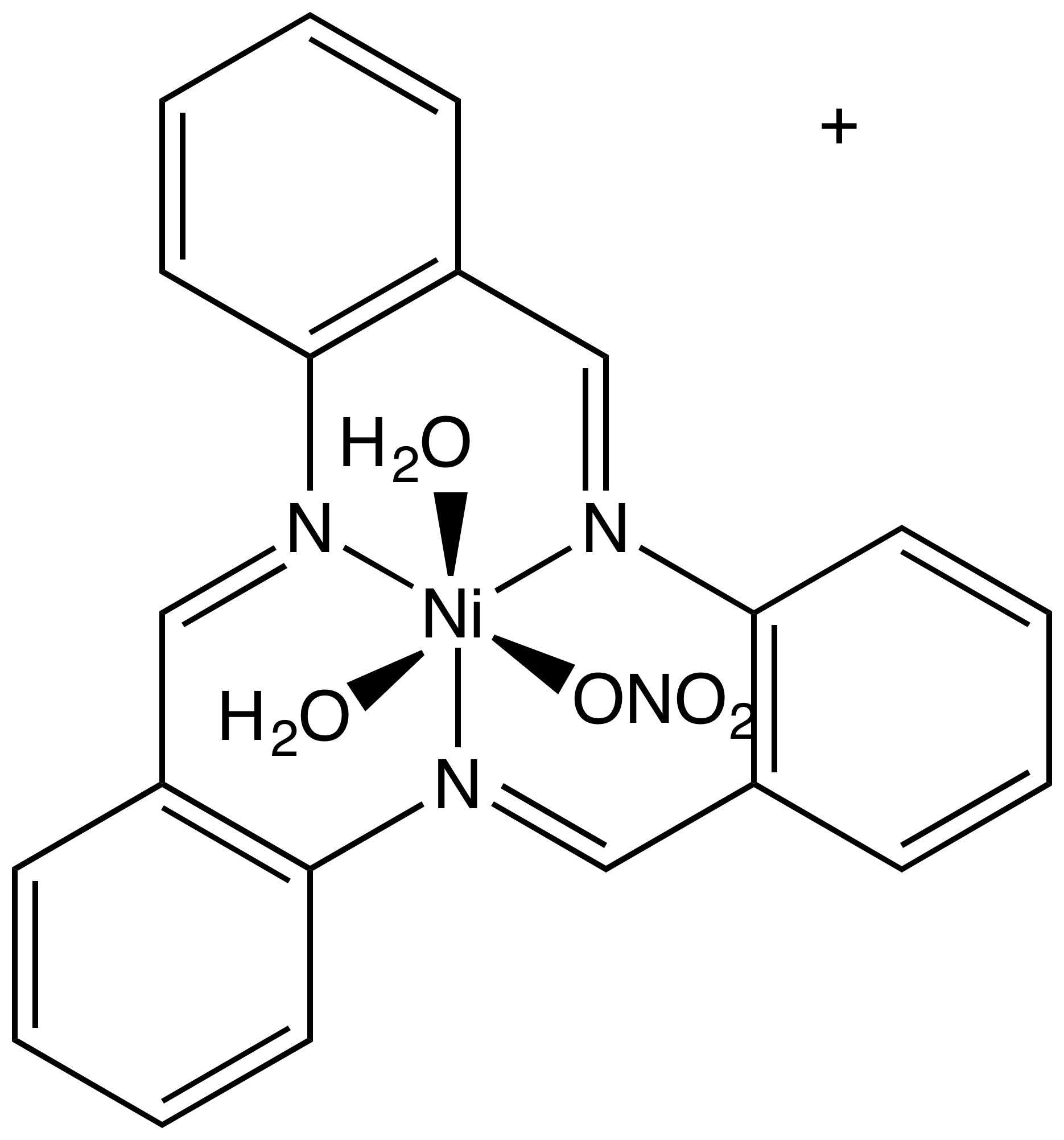
Structure of nickel-aquo nitrate complex of the ligand derived from condensation of three equivalents of 2-aminobenzaldehyde.
