= Franciszek Żmurko =

Polish realist painter

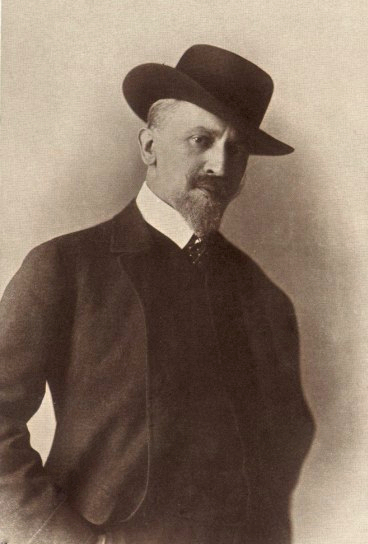
- Franciszek Żmurko
- Born: 18 July 1859; Lemburg, Austrian Empire
- Died: 9 October 1910 (aged 51); Warsaw
- Education: Academy of Fine Arts in Krakow
- Known for: Realist painting

Franciszek Żmurko (18 July 1859, Lviv – 9 October 1910, Warsaw) was a Polish realist painter. Żmurko began drawing lessons as a young boy in his hometown with the painter Franciszek Tepa. As an adolescent he relocated to Kraków to study at the Academy of Fine Arts where he took lessons from Professor Jan Matejko. In 1877 Żmurko moved to Vienna, Austria where he was accepted at the Vienna Academy, but left soon thereafter to study under Alexander von Wagner in Munich. 1882-1883 Zmurko lived in St.Peterburg. Żmurko returned to Kraków in 1880 and then moved to Warsaw in 1882, where he remained until his death in 1910.

== Notable works ==
- Zygmunt August i Barbara
- Zuzanna i starcy, 1879
- Z rozkazu padyszacha, 1881
- Nubijczyk, 1884
- Portret kobiety z wachlarzem, 1884
- Widzenie Fausta, 1890
- Kazimierz Wielki i Esterka
- Portret kobiety z wachlarzem i papierosem, 1891
- Autoportret z paletą, 1895
- Portret młodej kobiety, 1896
- Studium do obrazu "Laudamus feminam", c. 1900
- Półakt kobiecy, c. 1900
- Una donna
- Czarne warkocze, 1907

== Selected works ==
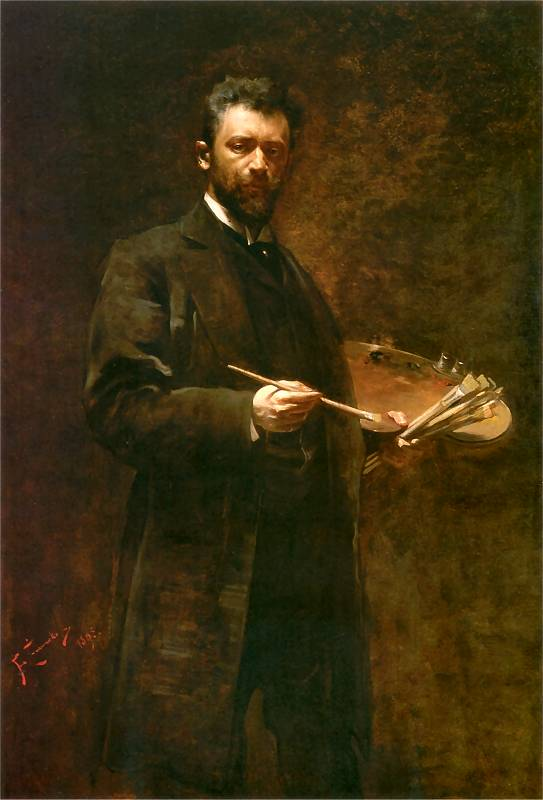
Self-portrait with a palette

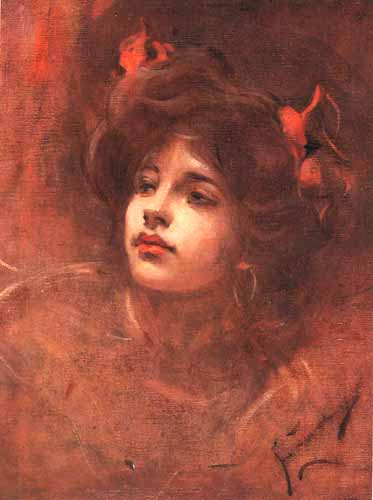
Girl with red ribbons in hair

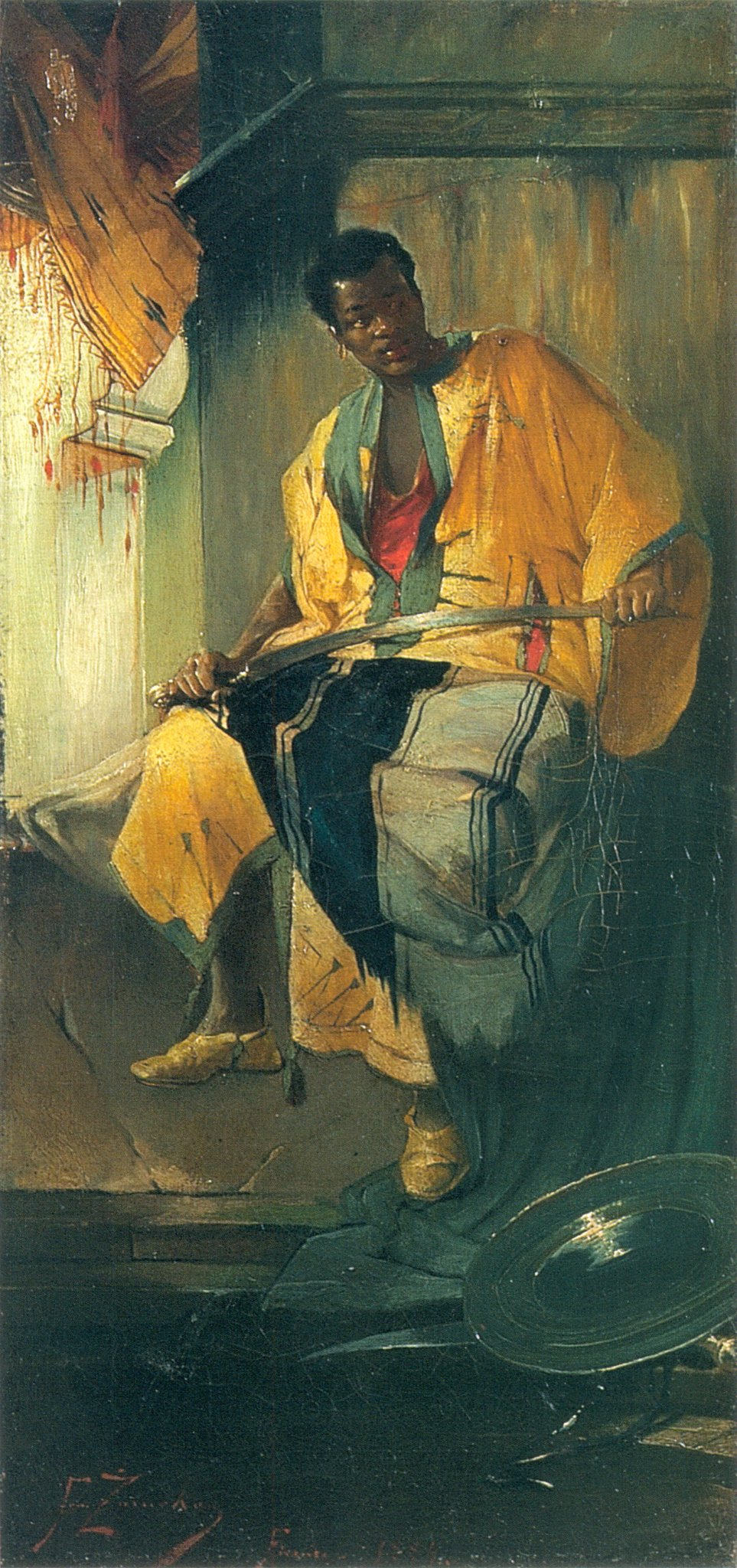
Nubian man, 1884

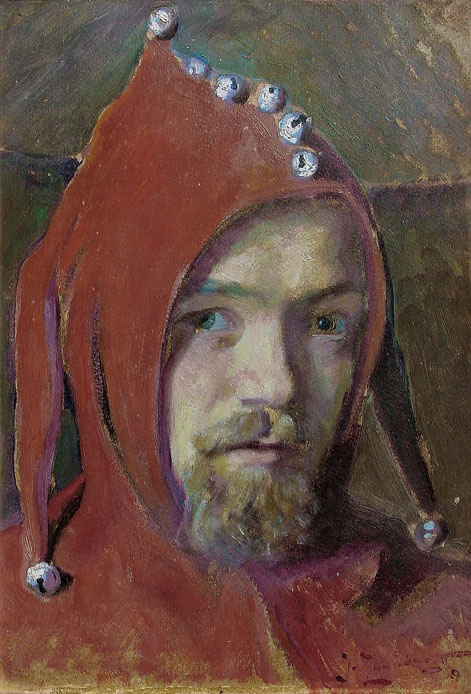
Self portrait as Stańczyk

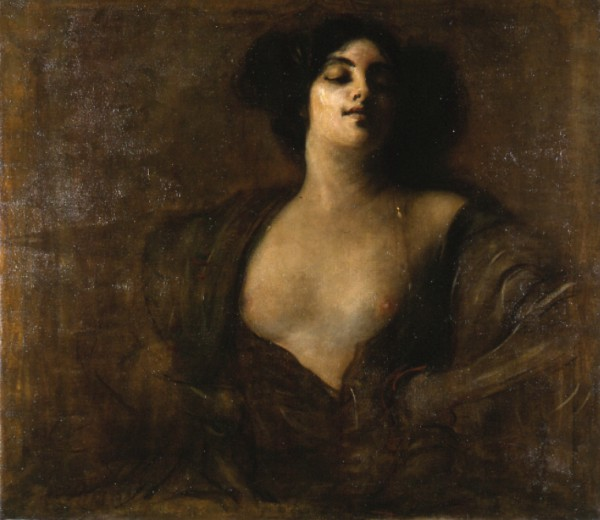
Hetaera, 1906. (lost between 1939 and 1945 (World War II).
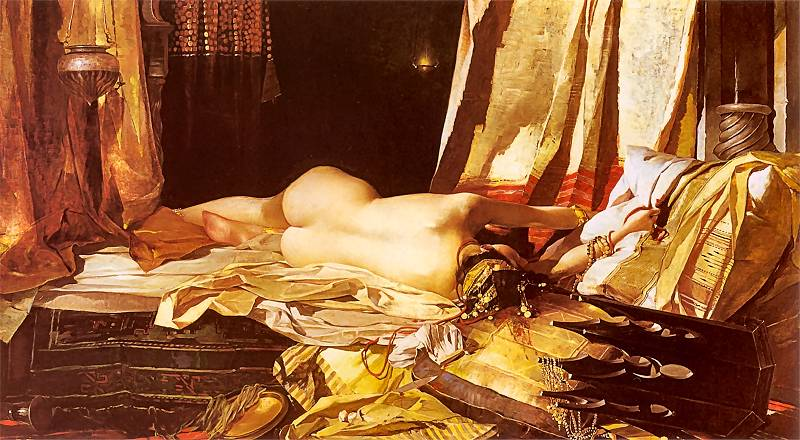
By order of the Padishah, 1881

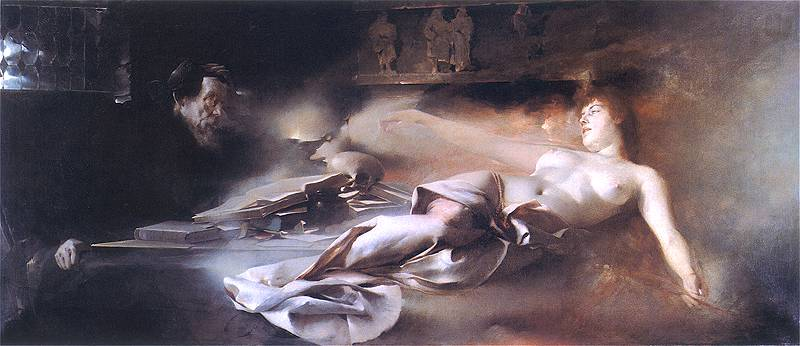
Faust's Vision, 1890

<https://smart-painting.org/catalog/hetera.html>

== See also ==
- Wawrzyniec Żmurko, mathematician, father of Franciszek
