= Cosmos (standard) =

Cosmetic regulatory standard in Europe

COSMOS, short for Cosmetic Organic and Natural Standard, sets certification requirements for organic and natural cosmetics products in the Europe. The standard is recognized globally by the cosmetic industry. By adhering to specific guidelines, cosmetics marketers can use COSMOS signatures, which are registered trademarks, on packaging to confirm the products meet minimum industry requirements to be considered organic or natural.

== History ==
In 2002 five European organisations responsible for setting organic and natural cosmetics standards met at a trade show to share ideas for broader standards to be used globally. These five COSMOS members are:

- BDIH (Germany)
- Cosmebio (France)
- Ecocert Greenlife SAS (France)
- ICEA (Italy)
- Soil Association (Great Britain)

Over 1,600 manufacturers who sell over 25,000 products across over 45 countries follow the standard, according to Cosmos-standard.org. About 85% of the certified cosmetics industry uses COSMOS signatures on its products.

Although the five members differed on certain standards separately, they were able to smooth out differences to create a harmonised international standard that was first published in 2010. At this time the five members formed a non-profit international association overseeing the standard. In June 2010 the COSMOS-standard AISBL was awarded Royal Assent from Belgian authorities. The documents published with the standard include:

- The Control Manual: describes how the control systems works
- The Labeling Rules: explains how to use COSMOS labels
- The Technical Guide: additional information

== Certification and Labeling Process ==
There are four main certification signatures that comprise the COSMOS-standard, which are for ORGANIC, NATURAL, COSMOS CERTIFIED and COSMOS APPROVED products. Here are six steps to gaining approval of product labeling within the certification process:

1. The authorized COSMOS-standard certification body must first approve of the product specification.
2. The applicant must submit their proposed product labeling to the certification body and await approval. Generic label designs for certain single-ingredient product are acceptable if the design is consistent for all products.
3. In the event the product specification is not approved first, the labeling can only get provisional approval.
4. Only after full approval of the labeling is granted by the certification body can the manufacturer print the labelling. The certification process must be completed before the labels can be used commercially.
5. If the manufacturer needs to make changes to the product or labeling after gaining certification, they must notify the certification body and wait for written approval or a certificate update. Further approval from the certification body will be needed if the manufacturer makes changes to the organic percentage of the ingredients. The vendor will also have to make an amendment to the ingredients.
6. Before the product can be launched, the labeling must be approved by the certification body and the product must be listed on the COSMOS-standard certificate. Printing labels without first getting approval can lead to certification withdrawal if the certification body determines the products and labels are non-compliant.

== Basic Labeling Requirements ==
Manufacturers and marketers are only allowed to use COSMOS terms and signatures for products authorized by the certification body. The certification body must be identified on product labels if it is not clearly mentioned anywhere else on the product. In cases in which the label size restricts product labeling, the certification body may allow flexibility as long as the product maintains the general principles of the Labeling Guide. The firm must at least mention the nature of the certification (such as organic or natural) and the identity of the certification body.

== Product Identification ==
Marketers are allowed to use the COSMOS terms and signatures on company letterhead and websites under certain conditions. All the products of a brand must be certified organic in order for the company to make the claim they are "COSMOS ORGANIC certified." Otherwise, the firm must be clear that only specific products have been certified organic. In other words, the use of the terms and signatures must not be misleading to the consumer.

Essentially, the labelling must clearly and accurately describe the product, which must comply with the standard. The marketer must avoid listing ingredients or naming the product in a way that implies it contains certain ingredients that are not present. Any use or branding of the term "organic," for example, must comply with the organic standard and not be confusing to the consumer.

The labeling must not confuse the terms "organic" and "natural," which have separate definitions and certifications based on the way the products and ingredients are processed. If a brand sells several organic products and a few natural products, they must make it clear in their labeling and marketing the differences. The firm must also be clear if some of its products have no certification at all. In other words, in order for a company to promote itself as "COSMOS ORGANIC certified," its entire range of products must meet the organic standard and be certified.

Companies are not allowed to use logos or seals that may mislead customers into believing the products are COSMOS certified.
