= Diazole =

Two chemical isomers, imidazole and pyrazole

Diazole refers to either one of a pair of isomeric chemical compounds with molecular formula C_{3}H_{4}N_{2}, having a five-membered ring consisting of three carbon atoms and two nitrogen atoms.

The two isomers are:

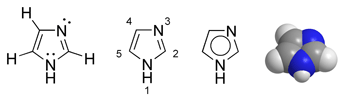
- Imidazole (1,3-diazole)
- Pyrazole (1,2-diazole)
