= Józef Morozewicz =

Polish mineralogist and petrologist

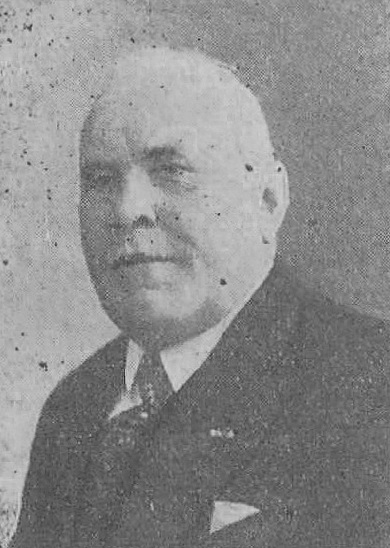
Photo of Jozef Moroxeeicz

Józef Morozewicz (27 March 1865 – 12 June 1941) was a Polish mineralogist and petrologist. He was the founder and first director of the National Geological Institute (Państwowy Instytut Geologiczny) from 1919-1937, as well as the founder and first president of the League of Protection of Nature (Liga Ochrony Przyrody).
