= 2-Methylimidazole =

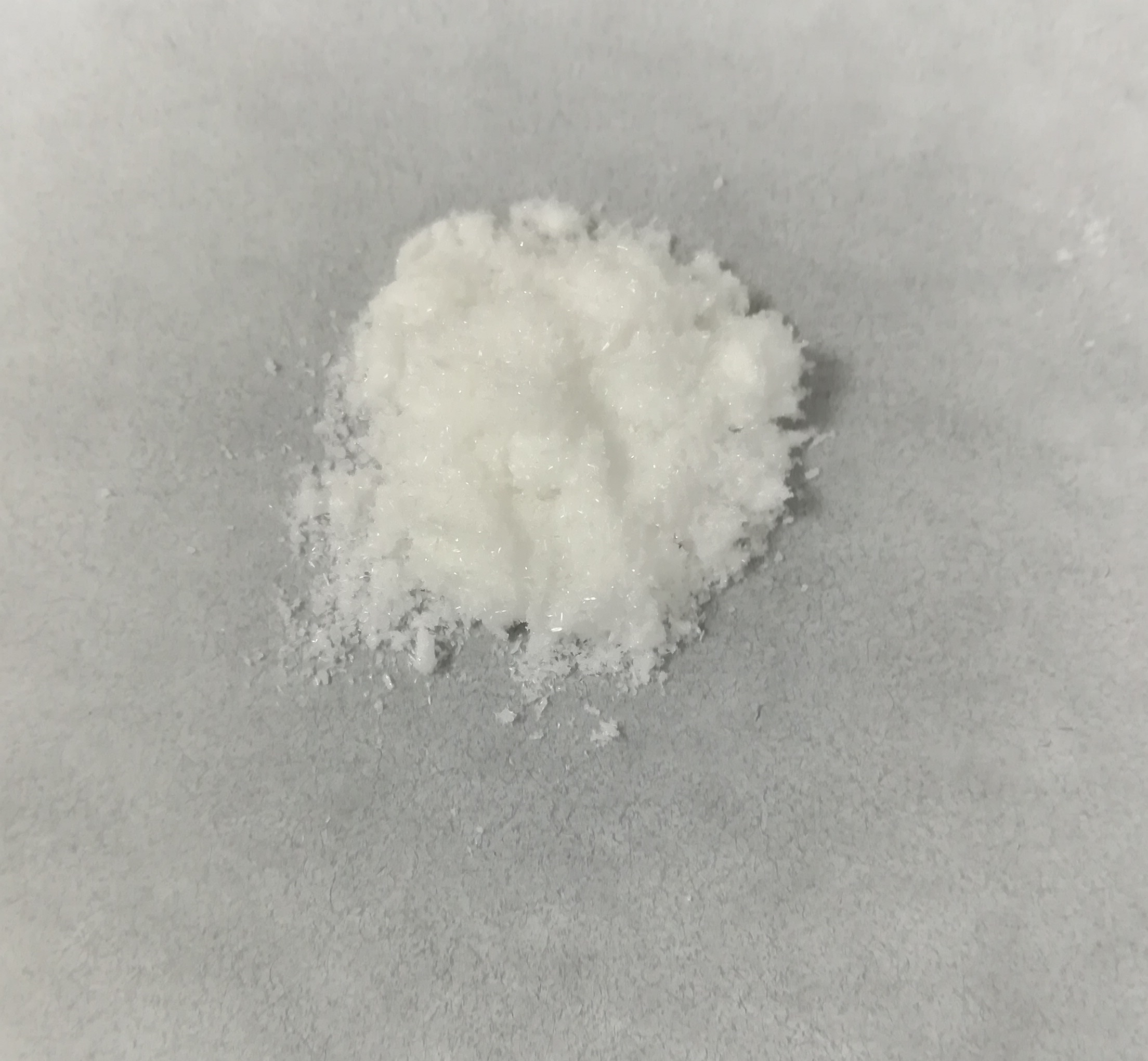

Names
- Preferred IUPAC name 2-Methyl-1H-imidazole
- Other names: 2-MeIm; 2-mImH

Identifiers
CAS Number	693-98-1
3D model (JSmol)	Interactive image
ChEBI	CHEBI:39837
ChemSpider	12225
ECHA InfoCard	100.010.697
PubChem CID	12749
UNII	T0049Z45LZ
CompTox Dashboard (EPA)	DTXSID4022107
- InChI: InChI=1S/C4H6N2/c1-4-5-2-3-6-4/h2-3H,1H3,(H,5,6) Key: LXBGSDVWAMZHDD-UHFFFAOYSA-N; InChI=1/C4H6N2/c1-4-5-2-3-6-4/h2-3H,1H3,(H,5,6) Key: LXBGSDVWAMZHDD-UHFFFAOYAM
- SMILES: Cc1[nH]ccn1

Properties
Chemical formula	C_{4}H_{6}N_{2}
Molar mass	82.10 g/mol
Appearance	white or colorless solid
Melting point	145 °C (293 °F; 418 K)
Boiling point	270 °C (518 °F; 543 K)
Solubility in water	0.29 g/ml

Hazards
- Occupational safety and health (OHS/OSH)
Main hazards	causes skin rashes and eye irritation
- Except where otherwise noted, data are given for materials in their standard state (at 25 °C [77 °F], 100 kPa). Infobox references

2-Methylimidazole is an organic compound that is structurally related to imidazole with the chemical formula CH_{3}C_{3}H_{2}N_{2}H. It is a white or colorless solid that is highly soluble in polar organic solvents and water. It is a precursor to a range of drugs and is a ligand in coordination chemistry.

== Synthesis and reactions ==
It is prepared by condensation of glyoxal, ammonia and acetaldehyde, a Radziszewski reaction. Nitration gives 5-nitro derivative.

2-Methylimidazole is a sterically hindered imidazole that is used to simulate the coordination of histidine to heme complexes. It can be deprotonated to make imidazolate-based coordination polymers.

== Applications ==
2-Methylimidazole is a precursor to the several members of the nitroimidazole antibiotics that are used to combat anaerobic bacterial and parasitic infections.

Nitroimidazole antibiotics and antiprotozoals containing 2-methylimidazole cores:

Dimetridazole

Metronidazole

Secnidazole

Ornidazole

Tinidazole

Carnidazole

== Safety ==
It has low toxicity with an LD_{50} (rat, oral) of 1300 mg/kg, but it is strongly irritating to the skin and eyes.

2-Methylimidazole is a REACH Regulation Candidate Substance of Very High Concern due to its endocrine disrupting properties.
