= Kosmos. Problemy Nauk Biologicznych =

- Publisher: Polish Copernicus Society of Naturalists
- Editor: Krystyna Skwarło-Sońta
- Founded: 1876
- Language: Polish
- Headquarters: Warsaw, Miecznikowa 1
- Website: kosmos.icm.edu.pl

Kosmos. Problemy Nauk Biologicznych (eng. Cosmos. Problems of Biological Sciences) is the scientific journal of the Polish Copernicus Society of Naturalists published from 1876 initially in Lviv, then in Warsaw. Current numbers are available in the online edition.

== See also ==
- Cosmos (disambiguation)#Journals
- Wszechświat (eng. The Universe)
