= Debus–Radziszewski imidazole synthesis =

Multi-component reaction used for the synthesis of imidazoles

Named after	Heinrich Debus; Bronisław Radziszewski
Reaction type	Ring forming reaction

The Debus–Radziszewski imidazole synthesis is a multi-component reaction used for the synthesis of imidazoles from a 1,2-dicarbonyl, an aldehyde, and ammonia or a primary amine. The method is used commercially to produce several imidazoles. The process is an example of a multicomponent reaction.

The reaction can be viewed as occurring in two stages. In the first stage, the dicarbonyl and two ammonia molecules condense with the two carbonyl groups to give a diimine:

In the second stage, this diimine condenses with the aldehyde:

However, the actual reaction mechanism is not certain.

This reaction is named after Heinrich Debus and Bronisław Leonard Radziszewski.

A modification of this general method, where one equivalent of ammonia is replaced by an amine, affords N-substituted imidazoles in good yields.

This reaction has been applied to the synthesis of a range of 1,3-dialkylimidazolium ionic liquids by using various readily available alkylamines.
