= Wawrzyniec Żmurko =

Polish mathematician (1824–1889)

- Portrait of Żmurko by Edward Trzemeski
- Born: July 9, 1824; Jaworiw, Kingdom of Galicia and Lodomeria, Austrian Empire
- Died: April 3, 1889 (aged 64); Lemberg, Kingdom of Galicia and Lodomeria, Austria-Hungary
- Education: Lwów University; TU Wien; University of Vienna
- Occupation: Mathematics professor
- Employer(s): Lwów University; Lwów Polytechnic
- Organization(s): Polish Copernicus Society of Naturalists; Polish Academy of Learning

Wawrzyniec Żmurko (9 July 1824, in Jaworów – 3 April 1889, in Lwów) was a Polish mathematician, professor of Lwów University and Lwów Polytechnic, honoris causa of Lwów University, member of Polish Academy of Learning. He was a president of Polish Copernicus Society of Naturalists (1879-1881). In 1885-1886 he was Rector of the Lwów University. He was the father of a painter, Franciszek Żmurko.

== Work ==
Żmurko was active in a number of different fields in mathematics, including differential equations, analytic functions theory, linear algebra and applications of mathematics. He published in both Polish and German. He also invented instruments for drawing conic sections and a device which he called the integrator for graphical solving of calculus integral problems.
