= 2,5-Furandicarboxaldehyde =

Names
- Preferred IUPAC name Furan-2,5-dicarbaldehyde
- Other names 2,5-Diformylfuran

Identifiers
CAS Number	823-82-5
3D model (JSmol)	Interactive image
Abbreviations	FDC
ChEBI	CHEBI:83385
ChemSpider	63172
ECHA InfoCard	100.011.382
EC Number	212-520-7
KEGG	C20899
PubChem CID	69980
UNII	L4HT8N2Z72
CompTox Dashboard (EPA)	DTXSID60231676
- InChI: InChI=1S/C6H4O3/c7-3-5-1-2-6(4-8)9-5/h1-4H Key: KUCOHFSKRZZVRO-UHFFFAOYSA-N
- SMILES: C1=C(OC(=C1)C=O)C=O

Properties
Chemical formula	C_{6}H_{4}O_{3}
Molar mass	124.095 g·mol^{−1}

Hazards
- GHS labelling
Pictograms	(GHS07: Exclamation mark)
Signal word	Warning
Hazard statements	H315, H319, H335
Precautionary statements	P261, P264, P271, P280, P302+P352, P305+P351+P338
- Except where otherwise noted, data are given for materials in their standard state (at 25 °C [77 °F], 100 kPa). Infobox references

2,5-Furandicarboxaldehyde (FDC) is an organic compound with the molecular formula C_{4}H_{2}O(CHO)_{2}. It consists of a furan ring with aldehyde groups on the 2 and 5 position. It is therefore classified as a dialdehyde.

== Synthesis ==
2,5-Furandicarboxaldehyde is an oxidation product of 5-hydroxymethyl furfural (HMF), which in turn can be prepared from fructose. Alternatively, methods have been developed to convert fructose in one step to 2,5-furandicarboxaldehyde. The conversion from fructose to HMF and FDC can be performed relatively efficiently and following the principles of green chemistry. As such, these materials are often considered as "greener" bio-based alternatives.

== Applications ==
2,5-Furandicarboxaldehyde can be used in the preparation of polyimine vitrimers. It can also be applied as an alternative to glutaraldehyde as crosslinking agent for covalent enzyme immobilisation.

== See also ==
- Terephthalaldehyde (TA)
- 2,5-Furandicarboxylic acid (FDCA)
