= Covalent adaptable network =

Polymer material

Covalent adaptable networks (CANs) are a type of polymer material that closely resemble thermosetting polymers (thermosets). However, they are distinguished from thermosets by the incorporation of dynamic covalent chemistry into the polymer network. When a stimulus (for example heat, light, pH, ...) is applied to the material, these dynamic bonds become active and can be broken or exchanged with other pending functional groups, allowing the polymer network to change its topology. This introduces reshaping, (re)processing and recycling into thermoset-like materials.

== Background ==
Historically, polymer materials have always been subdivided in two categories based on their thermomechanical behaviour. Thermoplastic polymer materials melt upon heating and become viscous liquids, whereas thermosetting polymer materials remain solid as a result of cross-linking.

Thermoplastics consist of long polymer chains that are stiff at service temperatures but become softer with increasing temperature. At low temperatures, the molecular motion of the polymer chains is limited due to chain-entanglements, resulting in a hard and glassy material. Increasing the temperature will lead to a transition from a hard to a soft material at the glass transition temperature (T_{g}) yielding a visco-elastic liquid. In the case of (semi-)crystalline polymer materials, viscous flow is achieved when the melting point (T_{m}) is reached and the intermolecular forces in the ordered crystalline domain are overcome. Thermoplastics regain their solid properties upon cooling and can thus be reshaped by polymer processing methods such as extrusion and injection moulding and they can also be recycled. Examples of thermoplastic polymers are polystyrene, polycarbonate, polyethylene, nylon, Acrylonitrile butadiene styrene (ABS), etc.

Thermosets, on the other hand, are three-dimensional networks that are formed through permanent chemical cross-linking of multifunctional compounds. This is an irreversible process that results in infusible and insoluble polymer networks with superior properties compared to most thermoplastics. When a thermoset is exposed to heat, it maintains its dimensional stability and thus cannot be reshaped. These polymer materials are generally used for demanding applications (e.g. wind turbines, aerospace, etc.) that require chemical resistance, dimensional stability and good mechanical properties. Typical thermosetting materials include epoxy resins, polyester resins, polyurethanes, etc.

In the framework of sustainability, the combination of the mechanical properties of thermosets with the reprocessability of thermoplastics through the introduction of dynamic bonds has been the topic of numerous research studies. The use of non-covalent interactions such as hydrogen bonding, pi-stacking or crystallization that lead to physical cross-links between polymer chains is one way of introducing dynamic cross-linking. The thermoreversible nature of the physical cross-links results in polymer materials with improved mechanical properties without losing reprocessability. The properties of these physical networks are highly dependent on the used backbone and type of non-covalent interactions, but typically they are brittle at low temperature and become elastic or rubbery above T_{g}. Upon further heating, the physical cross-links disappear and the material behaves as a visco-elastic liquid, allowing it to be reprocessed. These materials are also known as thermoplastic elastomers.

Covalent adaptable networks (CANs) instead use dynamic covalent bonds that are able to undergo exchange reactions upon application of an external stimulus, typically heat or light. In absence of a stimulus, these materials behave as thermosets, showing high chemical resistance and dimensional stability, but when the stimulus is applied, the dynamic bonds become activated, enabling the network to rearrange its topology on a molecular level. As a result, these materials are able to undergo permanent deformations, enabling reshaping, reprocessing, self-healing, etc. As such, CANs can be seen as an intermediate bridge between thermosets and thermoplastics.

In 2011, the research group of French researcher Ludwik Leibler developed a specific class of CANs based on an associative exchange mechanism (see subsection Classification). By adding a suitable catalyst to epoxy/acid polyester based networks, they were able to prepare a permanent epoxy network that showed a gradual viscosity decrease upon heating. This type of behaviour is typical for vitreous silica and had never before been seen in organic polymer materials. Therefore, the authors introduced the name Vitrimers for these kind of materials.

Recent advancements in the field of CANs have shown their potential to someday replace conventional non-recyclable thermosetting materials. The exponential growth of publications involving CANs seen in literature indicate the increasing interest from academia. Additionally, there's also a growing interest in CANs from industry with, for example, the first vitrimer start-up company Mallinda and multiple European Union funded research projects with collaborations between academic and industry partners (such as Vitrimat, PUReSmart and NIPU-EJD).

== Classification ==
CANs are currently subdivided in two groups, dissociative CANs and associative CANs, based on the underlying mechanism of the bond exchange reactions (i.e. the order in which the bond forming and breaking occurs) and their resulting temperature dependence.

=== Dissociative CANs ===
The exchange mechanism of dissociative CANs requires a bond-breaking event prior to the formation of a new bond (i.e. an elimination/addition pathway). Upon application of a stimulus, the equilibrium shifts to the dissociated state, resulting in a temporarily decreased cross-link density in the network. When a sufficient amount of dynamic bonds dissociate due to the equilibrium being shifted below the gel point, the material will suffer a loss of dimensional stability and show a sudden and drastic viscosity decrease. After removal of the stimulus, the bonds reform and, in the ideal case, the original cross-link density is restored. This temporary decrease in cross-link density enables very fast topology rearrangements in dissociative CANs, such as viscous flow and stress relaxation, which allows the reprocessing of covalently cross-linked polymer networks. Additionally, dissociative CANs can be solubilized in good solvents.

=== Associative CANs ===
In contrast to dissociative CANs, networks in associative CANs do not depolymerize upon application of a stimulus and maintain a near constant cross-link density. Here, the exchange mechanism relies on the formation of a new bond before fragmentation of another bond (i.e. an addition/elimination pathway). This means that bond exchange occurs via a temporarily more cross-linked intermediate state. However, in practice, this small increase will often be negligible, resulting in a practically constant cross-link density. As a result, associative CANs typically remain insoluble in inert solvents, even at elevated temperatures, although it has become apparent that some associative CANs can be dissolved in a good solvent.

In the case of Vitrimers, associative exchange is triggered by heat and the viscosity of these materials is controlled by chemical exchange reactions, leading to a linear dependence of viscosity with inverse temperature according to the Arrhenius law. The decreased viscosity caused by rapid dynamic bond exchanges enables stress relaxation and network topology rearrangements in these materials.

== Applications ==
=== Recycling of PU foams ===
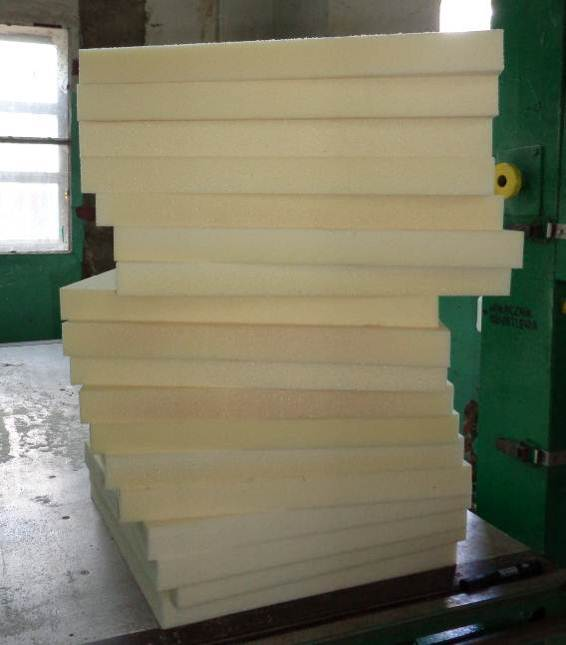
Polyurethane rigid foam is often used as insulation material for construction work.

Polyurethane (PU) foams are highly versatile engineering materials used for a wide range of applications such as mattresses, insulation, automotive, footwear and construction materials. Conventional PU foams are cross-linked materials or thermosets. PU foams can either be mechanically recycled (where PU foams are grinded and used as fillers), or chemically recycled (where PU foams are downcycled into polyols or other monomeric components via chemical degradation). However, most PU foams end up on landfills.

Currently, CANs are being investigated as a replacement for conventional foams, which would allow for easier recyclability of PU waste. For example, it was shown recently that the incorporation of disulfide bonds in PU foams led to their malleability and reprocessability into elastomers. Another possible solution is the addition of catalyst to post-consumer PU, which activates the exchange of urethane bonds and makes them reprocessable .

=== Self-healing materials ===
Polymer networks are susceptible to damage during their use. Self-healing is a promising tool to increase the lifetime and performance of the polymer, while simultaneously reducing plastic waste.

Self-healing can operate via extrinsic or intrinsic mechanisms. Extrinsic systems rely on the incorporation of small capsules containing healing agents that get released during damage/cracking and heal the material, while intrinsic systems are inherently able to restore their integrity through, for example, incorporation of dynamic bonds into the polymer network. A known example of intrinsic self-healing is thermally healable crosslinked networks with Diels-Alder adducts, but various other chemistries have also been investigated, including transesterification, olefin metathesis, and alkoxyamine chemistry. For polyimine CANs, it has been shown that self-healing can already occur at room temperature. However, additional heating may still significantly reduce the amount of time required.

Another promising strategy involves light-activated systems, such as photothermal and photoreversible chemistry. For photothermal systems, the healing is triggered by heating, even if light is the transient stimulus that makes the healing possible. Dynamic exchange reactions are also often activated by direct infrared heating with the assistance of photothermal fillers (e.g. carbon black, graphene, and gold nanoparticles). Self-healing materials based on direct photoreversible chemistry in principle don't involve heating. Some examples of this include the systems based on photoreversible cycloaddition that require ultraviolet (UV) irradiation, as well as photo-triggered radical reshufflings of sulfur-based dynamic covalent bonds.

Carbon nanotubes are added into the polymer phase and when an electric current is applied to them they heat up, which in turn heats up the material and activates the dynamic bonds.

=== Nanocomposites ===
Thermosets are currently in high demand for high-performance composites that are heavily needed in lightweight engineering and ultrahigh-performance mechanical parts. Applications include: packaging, remediation, energy storage, electromagnetic absorption, sensing and actuation, transportation and safety, defense systems, thermal flow control, information industry, catalysts, cosmetics, sports, etc. Such materials consist of a "soft" polymer phase that is combined with nanoparticles dispersed in the polymer phase. The shape of these nanoparticles can vary wildly, from rods to spheres to platelets, to fibres, etc.

The unique thermo-responsive properties of CANs, induced by bond exchange kinetics, open interesting possibilities for the introduction of property switches based on various external effects. For example, the addition of a resistive heater for electrothermal conversion (e.g. single walled carbon nanotubes) can allow for an on-demand mechanical property switch via an electric current. Alternatively, by adding a filler like graphene oxide, light irradiation can be used for an induced photo-thermal effect allowing for switching of the mechanical properties as a response to light-irradiation. Other interesting nanoparticles for the application in CANs include clay nanosheets, graphene,MOFs, and cellulose.

=== 3D printing ===
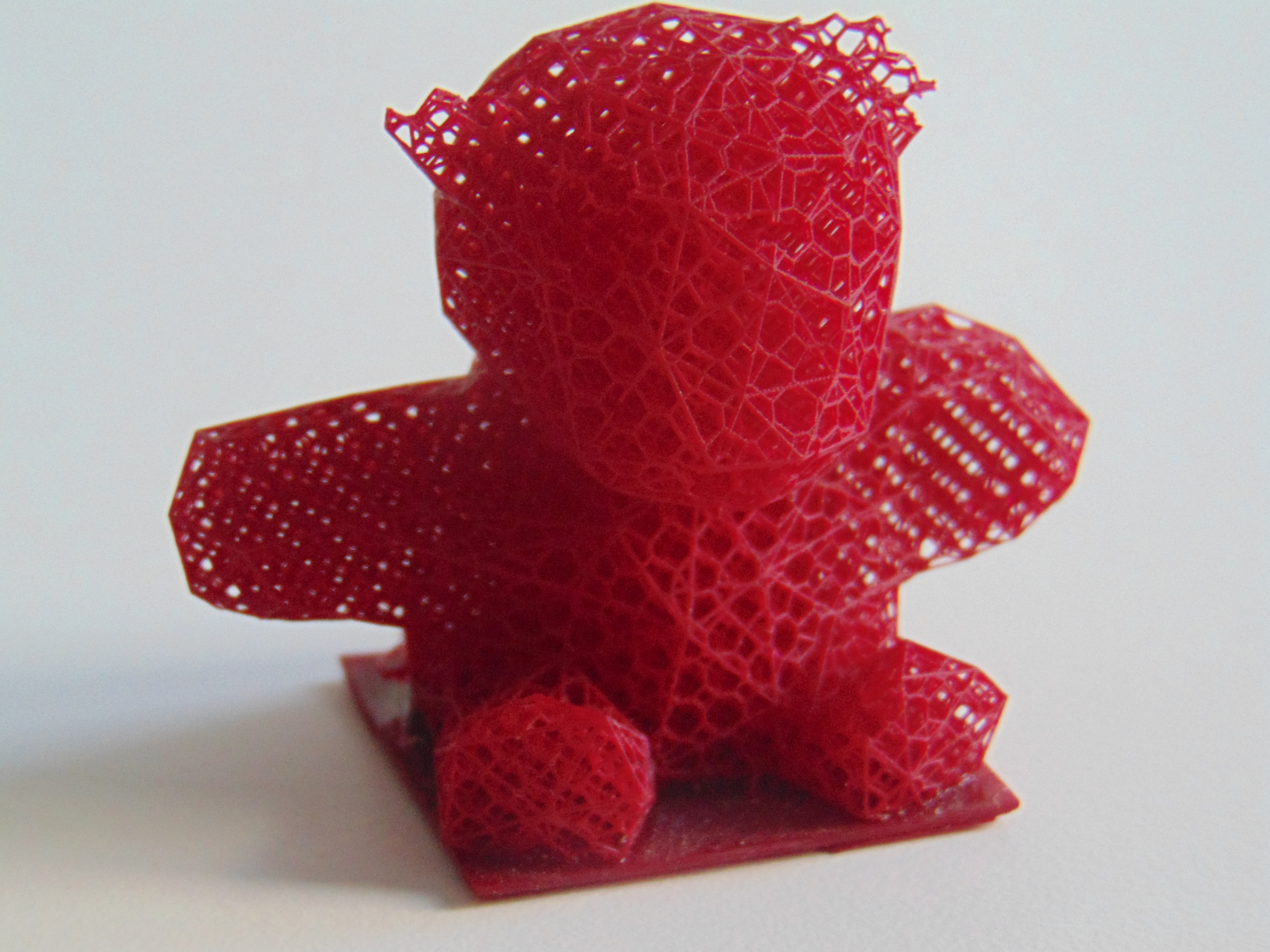
Using additive manufacturing, complex 3D structures can be made out of a vast range of raw resources. CANs are being investigated as resource for 3D printing to obtain recyclable 3D printed parts.

In recent years, 3D printing, or additive manufacturing (AM), saw rapid developments as the technique became more and more popular. Currently, plastics are the most common raw material used for 3D printing due to their wide availability, diversity and light weight. The versatility of AM and its significant development resulted in its use for many applications ranging from manufacturing and medical sectors to the custom art and design sector. With the market of 3D printing expected to grow even further in the coming years, the use of CANs as a resource for AM is under investigation as a replacement for traditional thermosets, which could make up 22% of the global market for AM by the end of 2029.

By replacing traditional thermoset ink with CAN-based inks, complicated 3D geometries can still be printed that behave like traditional thermosets with excellent mechanical properties at service conditions, but can later also be recycled into new ink for the next round of 3D printing. One example involved the 3D printing of an epoxy ink which is able to undergo transesterification reactions after printing. During the printing cycle, the ink is first slightly cured before being printed at high temperature into the desired 3D structure, and followed by a second curing step in an oven after printing. The printed epoxy parts can then be recycled by dissolving in ethylene glycol at high temperature and reused as ink in a new printing cycle.

== Chemistries used in CANs ==
Various dynamic chemistries have already been incorporated in CANs; some of the more notable ones include transesterification, Diels-Alder exchange, imine metathesis, disulfide exchange, transamination of vinylogous urethanes, transcarbamoylation of urethanes, olefin metathesis, and trans-N-alkylation of 1,2,3-triazolium salts.

== Sulfur-based CANs ==
Due to their relatively weak bond dissociation energy (in comparison to C−C bonds and the like), disulfides have been employed in CAN systems in order to allow for dynamic breakage and reformation of crosslinks. With disulfide groups as crosslinks, materials can be produced which are stable at room temperature while also allowing for reversible crosslink dissociation upon heating. The mechanism behind this reaction can be attributed to the cleavage of disulfide linkages (RS−SR) into thiyl radicals (2 RS•), resulting in reprocessability and self-healing characteristics for the bulk material. However, since the bond dissociation energy of the disulfide bond is still fairly high, it is typically necessary to augment the bond with adjacent chemistry that can stabilize the unpaired electron of the intermediate state. As such, studies usually employ aromatic disulfides or disulfidediamine (RNS−SNR) functional groups to encourage the dynamic dissociation of the S−S bond; these chemistries can result in the bond dissociation energy being reduced to half (or even less) of its prior magnitude.

In practical terms, disulfide-containing CANs are similar to thermosets. Typically, recyclability is restricted to thermoplastic materials, as said materials consist of polymer chains which are not bonded to each other at the molecular level; as a result, they can be melted down and reformed (as the addition of thermal energy allows the chains to untangle, move past each other, and adopt new configurations), but this comes at the expense of their physical robustness. Meanwhile, conventional thermosets contain permanent crosslinks which bolster their strength, toughness, creep resistance, and the like (as the bonding between chains provides resistance to deformation at the macroscopic level), but due to the permanence of said crosslinks, these materials cannot be reprocessed akin to thermoplastics. However, due to the dynamic nature of the crosslinks in disulfide CANs, they can be designed to exhibit the best attributes of both of the aforementioned material types. Studies have shown that disulfide CANs can be reprocessed multiple times with negligible degradation in performance while also exhibiting creep resistance, glass transition, and dynamic modulus values comparable to those observed in similar conventional thermoset systems.
