= Self-healing material =

Substances that can repair themselves

Animation 1. 3D measurement of self-healing material from Tosoh Corporation measured by digital holographic microscopy. The surface has been scratched by a metallic tool.

Animation 2. Section of self-healing material recovering from a scratch

Self-healing materials are artificial or synthetically created substances that have the built-in ability to automatically repair damages to themselves without any external diagnosis of the problem or human intervention. Generally, materials will degrade over time due to fatigue, environmental conditions, or damage incurred during operation. Cracks and other types of damage on a microscopic level have been shown to change thermal, electrical, and acoustical properties of materials, and the propagation of cracks can lead to eventual failure of the material. In general, cracks are hard to detect at an early stage, and manual intervention is required for periodic inspections and repairs. In contrast, self-healing materials counter degradation through the initiation of a repair mechanism that responds to the micro-damage. Some self-healing materials are classed as smart structures, and can adapt to various environmental conditions according to their sensing and actuation properties.

Although the most common types of self-healing materials are polymers or elastomers, self-healing covers all classes of materials, including metals, ceramics, and cementitious materials. Healing mechanisms vary from an instrinsic repair of the material to the addition of a repair agent contained in a microscopic vessel. For a material to be strictly defined as autonomously self-healing, it is necessary that the healing process occurs without human intervention. Self-healing polymers may, however, activate in response to an external stimulus (light, temperature change, etc.) to initiate the healing processes.

A material that can intrinsically correct damage caused by normal usage could prevent costs incurred by material failure and lower costs of a number of different industrial processes through longer part lifetime, and reduction of inefficiency caused by degradation over time.

== History ==
The ancient Romans used a form of lime mortar that has been found to have self-healing properties. By 2014, geologist Marie Jackson and her colleagues had recreated the type of mortar used in Trajan's Market and other Roman structures such as the Pantheon and the Colosseum and studied its response to cracking. The Romans mixed a particular type of volcanic ash called Pozzolane Rosse, from the Alban Hills volcano, with quicklime and water. They used it to bind together decimeter-sized chunks of tuff, an aggregate of volcanic rock. As a result of pozzolanic activity as the material cured, the lime interacted with other chemicals in the mix and was replaced by crystals of a calcium aluminosilicate mineral called strätlingite. Crystals of platey strätlingite grow in the cementitious matrix of the material including the interfacial zones where cracks would tend to develop. This ongoing crystal formation holds together the mortar and the coarse aggregate, countering crack formation and resulting in a material that has lasted for 1,900 years.

=== Materials science ===
Related processes in concrete have been studied microscopically since the 19th century.

Self healing materials only emerged as a widely recognized field of study in the 21st century. The first international conference on self-healing materials was held in 2007. The field of self-healing materials is related to biomimetic materials as well as to other novel materials and surfaces with the embedded capacity for self-organization, such as the self-lubricating and self-cleaning materials.

== Biomimetics ==
Plants and animals have the capacity to seal and heal wounds. In all plants and animals examined, firstly a self-sealing phase and secondly a self-healing phase can be identified. In plants, the rapid self-sealing prevents the plants from desiccation and from infection by pathogenic germs. This gives time for the subsequent self-healing of the injury which in addition to wound closure also results in the (partial) restoration of mechanical properties of the plant organ. Based on a variety of self-sealing and self-healing processes in plants, different functional principles were transferred into bio-inspired self-repairing materials. The connecting link between the biological model and the technical application is an abstraction describing the underlying functional principle of the biological model which can be for example an analytical model or a numerical model. In cases where mainly physical-chemical processes are involved a transfer is especially promising. There is evidence in the academic literature of these biomimetic design approaches being used in the development of self-healing systems for polymer composites. The DIW structure from above can be used to essentially mimic the structure of skin. Toohey et al. did this with an epoxy substrate containing a grid of microchannels containing dicyclopentadiene (DCPD), and incorporated Grubbs' catalyst to the surface. This showed partial recovery of toughness after fracture, and could be repeated several times because of the ability to replenish the channels after use. The process is not repeatable forever, because the polymer in the crack plane from previous healings would build up over time. Inspired by rapid self-sealing processes in the twining liana Aristolochia macrophylla and related species (pipevines) a biomimetic PU-foam coating for pneumatic structures was developed. With respect to low coating weight and thickness of the foam layer maximum repair efficiencies of 99.9% and more have been obtained. Other role models are latex bearing plants as the weeping fig (Ficus benjamina), the rubber tree (Hevea brasiliensis) and spurges (Euphorbia spp.), in which the coagulation of latex is involved in the sealing of lesions. Different self-sealing strategies for elastomeric materials were developed showing significant mechanical restoration after a macroscopic lesion.

== Self-healing polymers and elastomers ==
In the last century, polymers became a base material in everyday life for products like plastics, rubbers, films, fibres or paints. This huge demand has forced to extend their reliability and maximum lifetime, and a new design class of polymeric materials that are able to restore their functionality after damage or fatigue was envisaged. These polymer materials can be divided into two different groups based on the approach to the self-healing mechanism: intrinsic or extrinsic. Autonomous self-healing polymers follow a three-step process very similar to that of a biological response. In the event of damage, the first response is triggering or actuation, which happens almost immediately after damage is sustained. The second response is transport of materials to the affected area, which also happens very quickly. The third response is the chemical repair process. This process differs depending on the type of healing mechanism that is in place (e.g., polymerization, entanglement, reversible cross-linking). These materials can be classified according to three mechanisms (capsule-based, vascular-based, and intrinsic), which can be correlated chronologically through four generations. While similar in some ways, these mechanisms differ in the ways that response is hidden or prevented until actual damage is sustained.

=== Polymer breakdown ===
From a molecular perspective, traditional polymers yield to mechanical stress through cleavage of sigma bonds. While newer polymers can yield in other ways, traditional polymers typically yield through homolytic or heterolytic bond cleavage. The factors that determine how a polymer will yield include: type of stress, chemical properties inherent to the polymer, level and type of solvation, and temperature. From a macromolecular perspective, stress induced damage at the molecular level leads to larger scale damage called microcracks. A microcrack is formed where neighboring polymer chains have been damaged in close proximity, ultimately leading to the weakening of the fiber as a whole.

Using polymer scaling laws and the segmental relaxation of a chain, one can relate the kinetics of bond breaking (binding time $T_b$) to the frequency $\omega$, amplitude $A$ of the excitation and the friction coefficient $\gamma$ of embedded matrix,

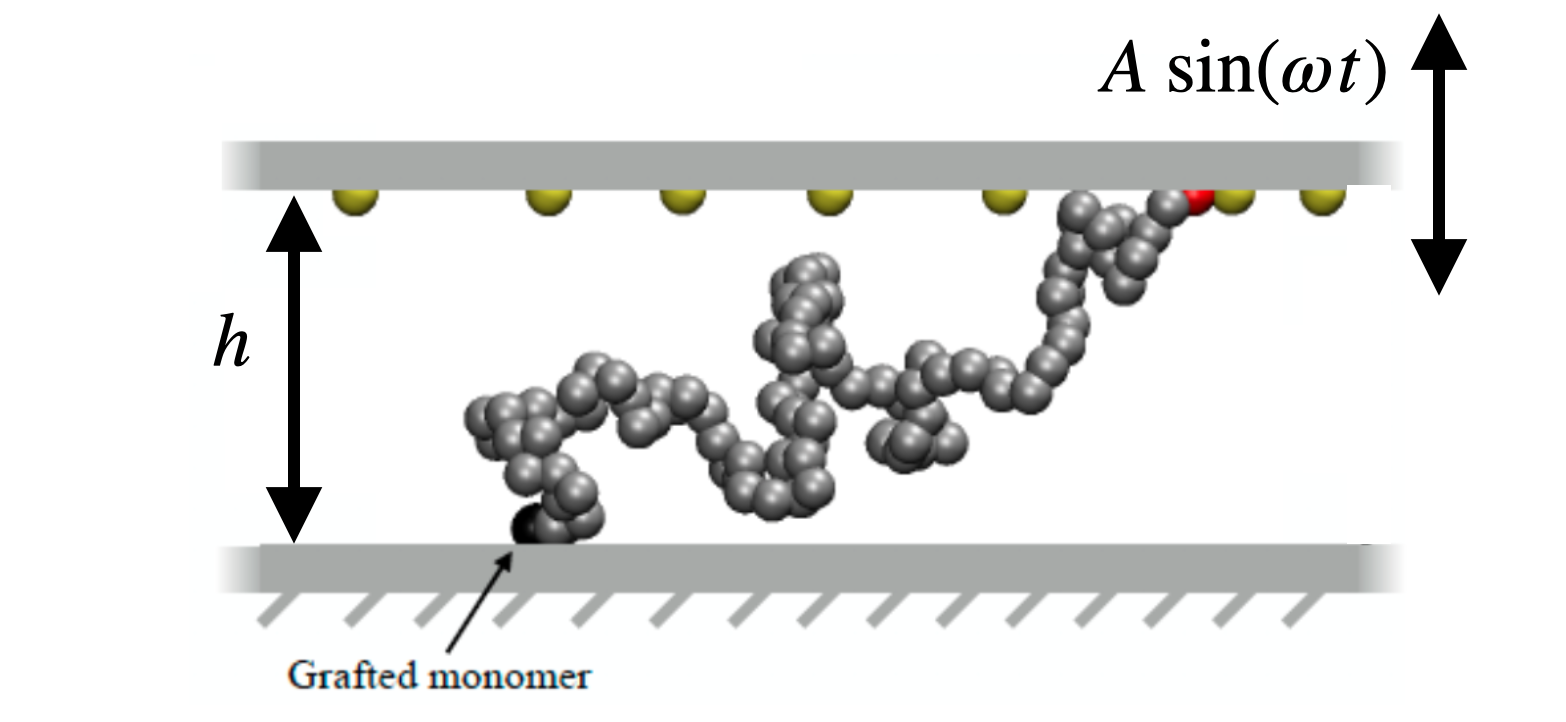
The polymer chain under confinement and oscillatory oscillations. The chain resembles the polymer at the interface of a crack in self-healing materials.

$T_{b} \sim e^{-\frac{z(\omega)\gamma A\omega}{k_BT}}$

Here, $z(\omega)$ is the number of unrelaxed monomer at the fracture interface and $k_BT$ is the thermal energy. Using Rouse relaxation time and a single grafted chain at the interface, one can show that $z(\omega)=\sqrt{3/4}(\omega\gamma)^{-1/2}$.

==== Homolytic bond cleavage ====
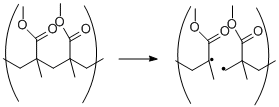
Scheme 1. Homolytic cleavage of poly(methyl methacrylate) (PMMA).

Polymers have been observed to undergo homolytic bond cleavage through the use of radical reporters such as DPPH (2,2-diphenyl-1-picrylhydrazyl) and PMNB (pentamethylnitrosobenzene.) When a bond is cleaved homolytically, two radical species are formed that can recombine to repair damage or can initiate other homolytic cleavages which can in turn lead to more damage.

==== Heterolytic bond cleavage ====
Scheme 2. Heterolytic cleavage of polyethylene glycol.

Polymers have also been observed to undergo heterolytic bond cleavage through isotope labeling experiments. When a bond is cleaved heterolytically, cationic and anionic species are formed that can in turn recombine to repair damage, can be quenched by solvent, or can react destructively with nearby polymers.

==== Reversible bond cleavage ====
Certain polymers yield to mechanical stress in an atypical, reversible manner. Diels-Alder-based polymers undergo a reversible cycloaddition, where mechanical stress cleaves two sigma bonds in a retro Diels-Alder reaction. This stress results in additional pi-bonded electrons as opposed to radical or charged moieties.

==== Supramolecular breakdown ====
Supramolecular polymers are composed of monomers that interact non-covalently. Common interactions include hydrogen bonds, metal coordination, and van der Waals forces. Mechanical stress in supramolecular polymers causes the disruption of these specific non-covalent interactions, leading to monomer separation and polymer breakdown.

=== Intrinsic polymer-based systems ===
In intrinsic systems, the material is inherently able to restore its integrity. While extrinsic approaches are generally autonomous, intrinsic systems often require an external trigger for the healing to take place (such as thermo-mechanical, electrical, photo-stimuli, etc.). It is possible to distinguish among 5 main intrinsic self-healing strategies. The first one is based on reversible reactions, and the most widely used reaction scheme is based on Diels-Alder (DA) and retro-Diels-Alder (rDA) reactions. Another strategy achieves the self-healing in thermoset matrices by incorporating meltable thermoplastic additives. A temperature trigger allows the redispertion of thermoplastic additives into cracks, giving rise to mechanical interlocking. Polymer interlockings based on dynamic supramolecular bonds or ionomers represent a third and fourth scheme. The involved supramolecular interactions and ionomeric clusters are generally reversible and act as reversible cross-links, thus can equip polymers with self-healing ability. Finally, an alternative method for achieving intrinsic self-healing is based on molecular diffusion.

==== Reversible bond-based polymers ====
Reversible systems are polymeric systems that can revert to the initial state whether it is monomeric, oligomeric, or non-cross-linked. Since the polymer is stable under normal condition, the reversible process usually requires an external stimulus for it to occur. For a reversible healing polymer, if the material is damaged by means such as heating and reverted to its constituents, it can be repaired or "healed" to its polymer form by applying the original condition used to polymerize it.

==== Polymer systems based on covalent bond formation and breakage ====
===== Diels-Alder and retro-Diels-Alder =====
Among the examples of reversible healing polymers, the Diels-Alder (DA) reaction and its retro-Diels-Alder (RDA) analogue seems to be very promising due to its thermal reversibility. In general, the monomer containing the functional groups such as furan or maleimide form two carbon-carbon bonds in a specific manner and construct the polymer through DA reaction. This polymer, upon heating, breaks down to its original monomeric units via RDA reaction and then reforms the polymer upon cooling or through any other conditions that were initially used to make the polymer. During the last few decades, two types of reversible polymers have been studied: (i) polymers where the pendant groups, such as furan or maleimide groups, cross-link through successive DA coupling reactions; (ii) polymers where the multifunctional monomers link to each other through successive DA coupling reactions.

====== Cross-linked polymers ======
In this type of polymer, the polymer forms through the cross linking of the pendant groups from the linear thermoplastics. For example, Saegusa et al. have shown the reversible cross-linking of modified poly(N-acetylethyleneimine)s containing either maleimide or furancarbonyl pendant moideties. The reaction is shown in Scheme 3. They mixed the two complementary polymers to make a highly cross-linked material through DA reaction of furan and maleimide units at room temperature, as the cross-linked polymer is more thermodynamically stable than the individual starting materials. However, upon heating the polymer to 80 °C for two hours in a polar solvent, two monomers were regenerated via RDA reaction, indicating the breaking of polymers. This was possible because the heating energy provided enough energy to go over the energy barrier and results in the two monomers. Cooling the two starting monomers, or damaged polymer, to room temperature for 7 days healed and reformed the polymer.

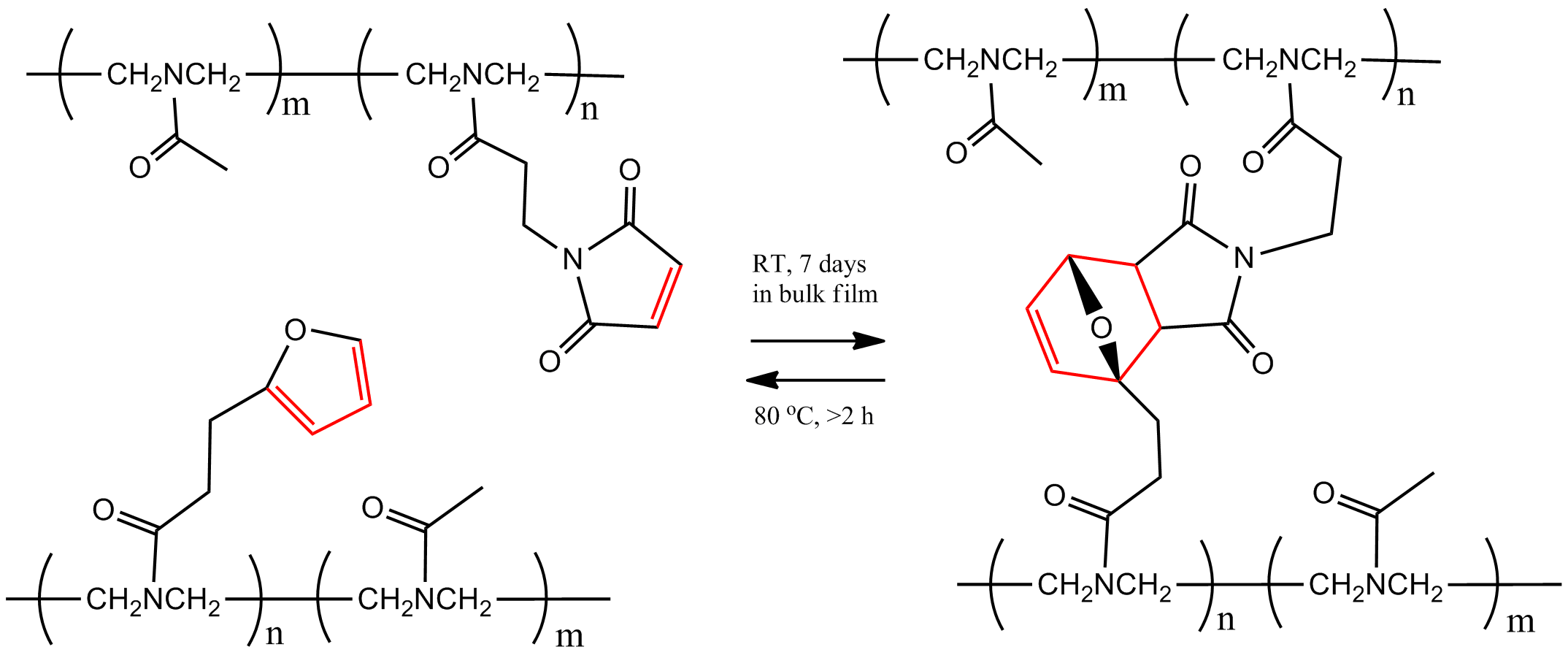
Scheme 3. Reversible polymer cross-linking via Diels-Alder cycloaddition reaction between furan and maleimide.

The reversible DA/RDA reaction is not limited to furan-meleimides based polymers as it is shown by the work of Schiraldi et al. They have shown the reversible cross-linking of polymers bearing pendent anthracene group with maleimides. However, the reversible reaction occurred only partially upon heating to 250 °C due to the competing decomposition reaction.

====== Polymerization of multifunctional monomers ======
In these systems, the DA reaction takes place in the backbone itself to construct the polymer, not as a link. For polymerization and healing processes of a DA-step-growth furan-maleimide based polymer (3M4F) were demonstrated by subjecting it to heating/cooling cycles. Tris-maleimide (3M) and tetra-furan (4F) formed a polymer through DA reaction and, when heated to 120 °C, de-polymerized through RDA reaction, resulting in the starting materials. Subsequent heating to 90–120 °C and cooling to room temperature healed the polymer, partially restoring its mechanical properties through intervention. The reaction is shown in Scheme 4.

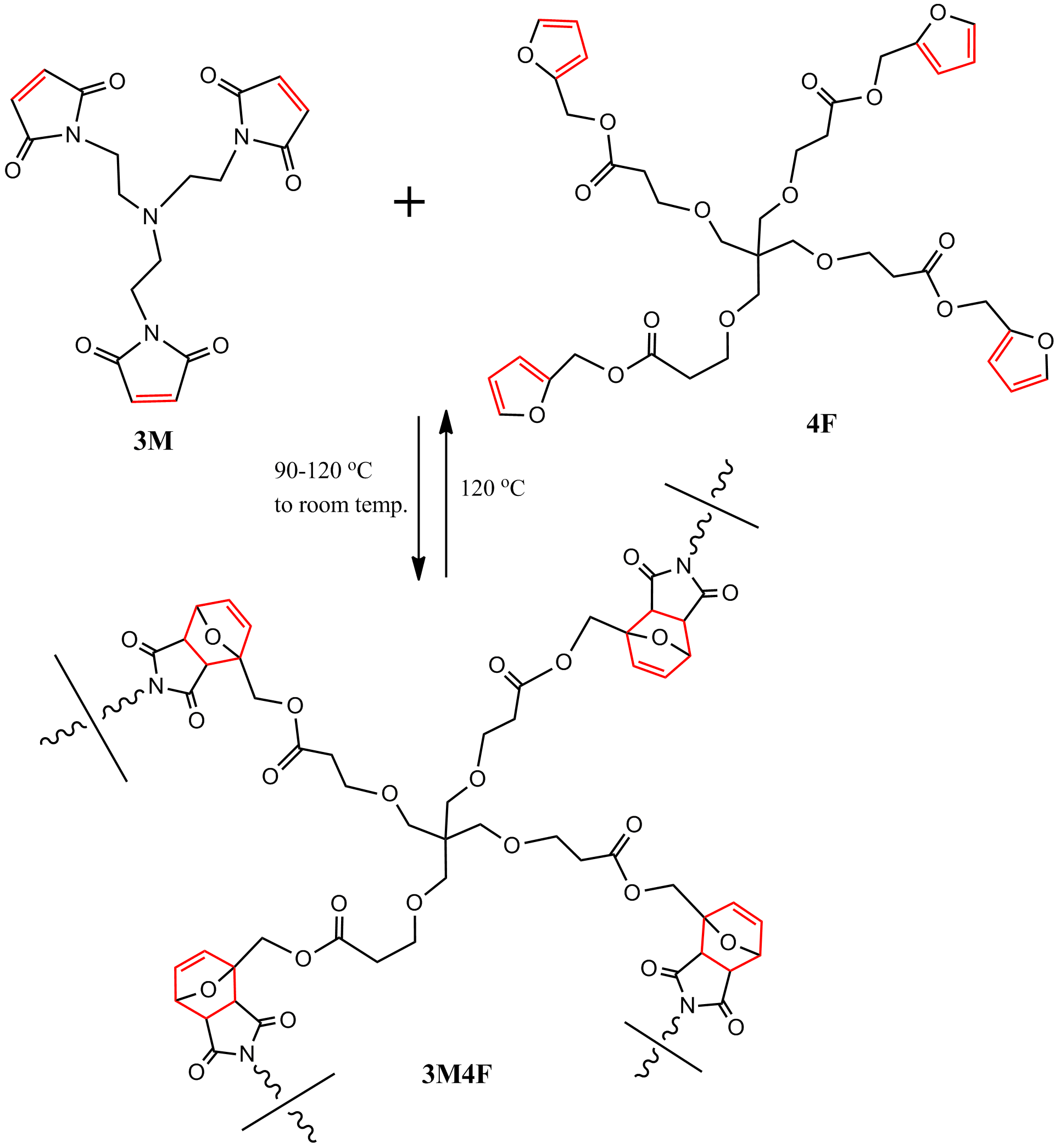
Scheme 4. Reversible highly cross-linked furan-maleimide based polymer network.

===== Thiol-based polymers =====
The thiol-based polymers have disulfide bonds that can be reversibly cross-linked through oxidation and reduction. Under reducing condition, the disulfide (SS) bridges in the polymer breaks and results in monomers, however, under oxidizing condition, the thiols (SH) of each monomer forms the disulfide bond, cross-linking the starting materials to form the polymer. Chujo et al. have shown the thiol-based reversible cross-linked polymer using poly(N-acetylethyleneimine). (Scheme 5)

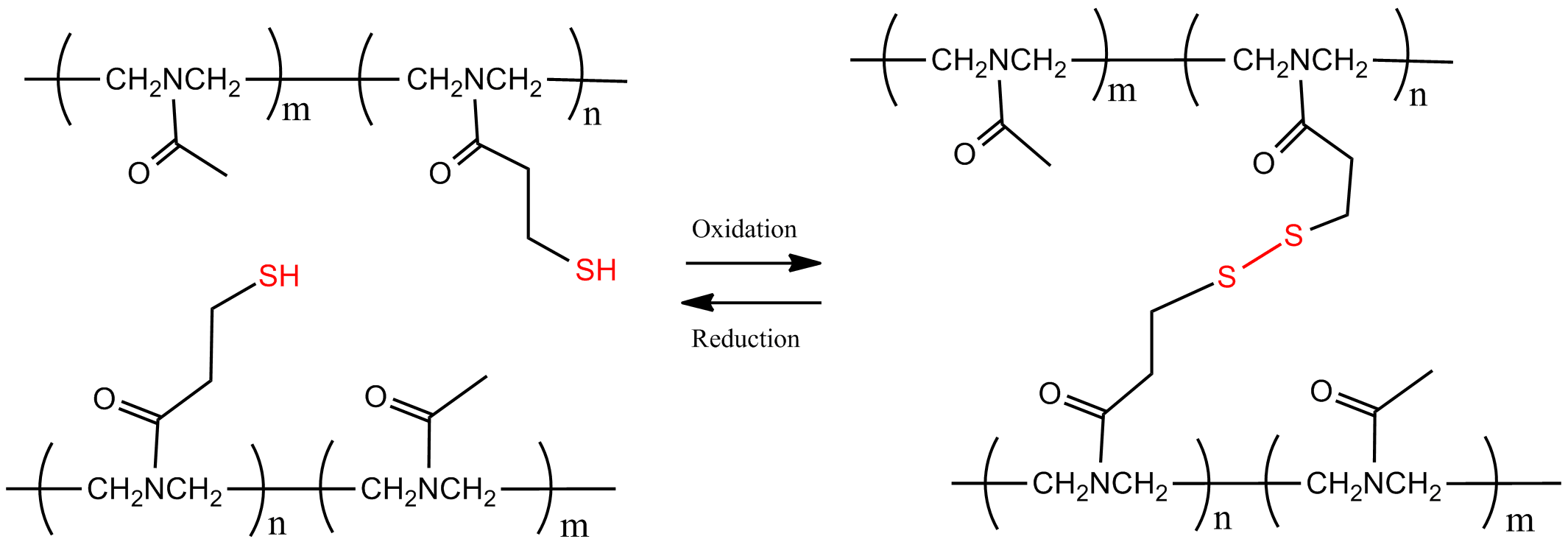
Scheme 5. Reversible polymer cross-linking by disulfide bridges.

===== Poly(urea-urethane) =====
A soft poly(urea-urethane) network uses the metathesis reaction in aromatic disulphides to provide room-temperature self-healing properties, without the need for external catalysts. This chemical reaction is naturally able to create covalent bonds at room temperature, allowing the polymer to autonomously heal without an external source of energy. Left to rest at room temperature, the material mended itself with 80 percent efficiency after only two hours and 97 percent after 24 hours. In 2014 a polyurea elastomer-based material was shown to be self-healing, melding together after being cut in half, without the addition of catalysts or other chemicals. The material also include inexpensive commercially available compounds. The elastomer molecules were tweaked, making the bonds between them longer. The resulting molecules are easier to pull apart from one another and better able to rebond at room temperature with almost the same strength. The rebonding can be repeated. Stretchy, self-healing paints and other coatings recently took a step closer to common use, thanks to research being conducted at the University of Illinois. Scientists there have used "off-the-shelf" components to create a polymer that melds back together after being cut in half, without the addition of catalysts or other chemicals.

The urea-urethane polymers however have glassy transition temperatures below 273 K therefore at room temperature they are gels and their tensile strength is low. To optimize the tensile strength the reversible bonding energy, or the polymer length must be increased to increase the degree of covalent or mechanical interlocking respectively. However, increase polymer length inhibits mobility and thereby impairs the ability for polymers to re-reversibly bond. Thus at each polymer length an optimal reversible bonding energy exists.

===== Vitrimers =====
Vitrimers are a subset of polymers that bridge the gap between thermoplastics and thermosets. Their dependence on dissociative and associative exchange within dynamic covalent adaptable networks allows for a variety of chemical systems to be accessed that allow for the synthesis of mechanically robust materials with the ability to be reprocessed many times while maintaining their structural properties and mechanical strength. The self-healing aspect of these materials is due to the bond exchange of crosslinked species as a response to applied external stimuli, such as heat. Dissociative exchange is the process by which crosslinks are broken prior to recombination of crosslinking species, thereby recovering the crosslink density after exchange. Examples of dissociative exchange include reversible pericyclic reactions, nucleophilic transalkylation, and aminal transamination. Associative exchange involves the substitution reaction with an existing crosslink and the retention of crosslinks throughout exchange. Examples of associative exchange include transesterification, transamination of vinylogous urethanes, imine exchange, and transamination of diketoneamines. Vitrimers possessing nanoscale morphology are being studied, through the use of block copolymer vitrimers in comparison to statistical copolymer analogues, to understand the effects of self-assembly on exchange rates, viscoelastic properties, and reprocessability. Other than recycling, vitrimer materials show promise for applications in medicine, for example self-healable bioepoxy, and applications in self-healing electronic screens. While these polymeric systems are still in their infancy they serve to produce commercially relevant, recyclable materials in the coming future as long as more work is done to tailor these chemical systems to commercially relevant monomers and polymers, as well as develop better mechanical testing and understanding of material properties throughout the lifetime of these materials (i.e. post reprocess cycles).

Copolymers with van der Waals force

If perturbation of van der Waals forces upon mechanical damage is energetically unfavourable, interdigitated alternating or random copolymer motifs will self-heal to an energetically more favourable state without external intervention. This self-healing behavior occurs within a relatively narrow compositional range depended on a viscoelastic response that energetically favours self-recovery upon chain separation, owing to 'key-and-lock' associations of the neighbouring chains. In essence, van der Waals forces stabilize neighbouring copolymers, which is reflected in enhanced cohesive-energy density (CED) values. Urban etc. illustrates how induced dipole interactions for alternating or random poly(methyl methacrylate-alt-ran-n-butyl acrylate) (p(MMA-alt-ran-nBA)) copolymers owing to directional van der Waals forces may enhance the CED at equilibrium (CEDeq) of entangled and side-by-side copolymer chains.

=== Extrinsic polymer-based systems ===
In extrinsic systems, the healing chemistries are separated from the surrounding polymer in microcapsules or vascular networks which, after material damage/cracking, release their content into the crack plane, reacting and allowing the restoration of material functionalities. These systems can be further subdivided in several categories. While capsule-based polymers sequester the healing agents in little capsules that only release the agents if they are ruptured, vascular self-healing materials sequester the healing agent in capillary type hollow channels that can be interconnected one dimensionally, two dimensionally, or three dimensionally. After one of these capillaries is damaged, the network can be refilled by an outside source or another channel that was not damaged. Intrinsic self-healing materials do not have a sequestered healing agent but instead have a latent self-healing functionality that is triggered by damage or by an outside stimulus. Extrinsic self-healing materials can achieve healing efficiencies over 100% even when the damage is large.

==== Microcapsule healing ====
Capsule-based systems have in common that healing agents are encapsulated into suitable microstructures that rupture upon crack formation and lead to a follow-up process in order to restore the materials' properties. If the walls of the capsule are created too thick, they may not fracture when the crack approaches, but if they are too thin, they may rupture prematurely. In order for this process to happen at room temperature, and for the reactants to remain in a monomeric state within the capsule, a catalyst is also imbedded into the thermoset. The catalyst lowers the energy barrier of the reaction and allows the monomer to polymerize without the addition of heat. The capsules around the monomer are important to maintain separation until the crack facilitates the reaction. In the capsule-catalyst system, the encapsulated healing agent is released into the polymer matrix and reacts with the catalyst, already present in the matrix. There are many challenges in designing this type of material. First, the reactivity of the catalyst must be maintained even after it is enclosed in wax. Additionally, the monomer must flow at a sufficient rate (have low enough viscosity) to cover the entire crack before it is polymerized, or full healing capacity will not be reached. Finally, the catalyst must quickly dissolve into the monomer in order to react efficiently and prevent the crack from spreading further.

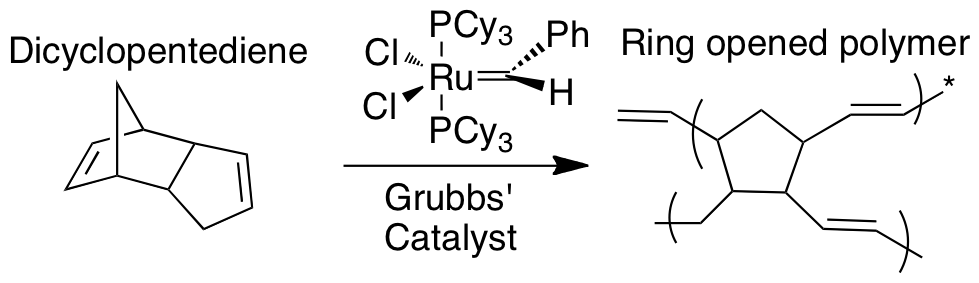
Scheme 6. ROMP of DCPD via Grubbs' catalyst

This process has been demonstrated with dicyclopentadiene (DCPD) and Grubbs' catalyst (benzylidene-bis(tricyclohexylphosphine)dichlororuthenium). Both DCPD and Grubbs' catalyst are imbedded in an epoxy resin. The monomer on its own is relatively unreactive and polymerization does not take place. When a microcrack reaches both the capsule containing DCPD and the catalyst, the monomer is released from the core–shell microcapsule and comes in contact with exposed catalyst, upon which the monomer undergoes ring opening metathesis polymerization (ROMP). The metathesis reaction of the monomer involves the severance of the two double bonds in favor of new bonds. The presence of the catalyst allows for the energy barrier (energy of activation) to be lowered, and the polymerization reaction can proceed at room temperature. The resulting polymer allows the epoxy composite material to regain 67% of its former strength.

Grubbs' catalyst is a good choice for this type of system because it is insensitive to air and water, thus robust enough to maintain reactivity within the material. Using a live catalyst is important to promote multiple healing actions. The major drawback is the cost. It was shown that using more of the catalyst corresponded directly to higher degree of healing. Ruthenium is quite costly, which makes it impractical for commercial applications.

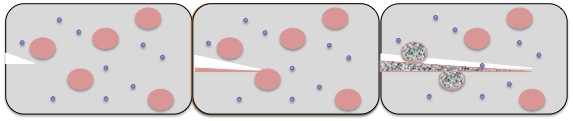
Figure 1. Depiction of crack propagation through microcapsule-imbedded material. Monomer microcapsules are represented by pink circles and catalyst is shown by purple dots.

In contrast, in multicapsule systems both the catalyst and the healing agent are encapsulated in different capsules. In a third system, called latent functionality, a healing agent is encapsulated, that can react with the polymerizer component that is present in the matrix in the form of residual reactive functionalities. In the last approach (phase separation), either the healing agent or the polymerizer is phase-separated in the matrix material.

==== Vascular approaches ====
The same strategies can be applied in 1D, 2D and 3D vascular based systems.

==== Hollow tube approach ====
For the first method, fragile glass capillaries or fibers are imbedded within a composite material. (Note: this is already a commonly used practice for strengthening materials. See Fiber-reinforced plastic.) The resulting porous network is filled with monomer. When damage occurs in the material from regular use, the tubes also crack and the monomer is released into the cracks. Other tubes containing a hardening agent also crack and mix with the monomer, causing the crack to be healed. There are many things to take into account when introducing hollow tubes into a crystalline structure. First to consider is that the created channels may compromise the load bearing ability of the material due to the removal of load bearing material. Also, the channel diameter, degree of branching, location of branch points, and channel orientation are some of the main things to consider when building up microchannels within a material. Materials that don't need to withstand much mechanical strain, but want self-healing properties, can introduce more microchannels than materials that are meant to be load bearing. There are two types of hollow tubes: discrete channels, and interconnected channels.

===== Discrete channels =====
Discrete channels can be built independently of building the material and are placed in an array throughout the material. When creating these microchannels, one major factor to take into account is that the closer the tubes are together, the lower the strength will be, but the more efficient the recovery will be. A sandwich structure is a type of discrete channels that consists of tubes in the center of the material, and heals outwards from the middle. The stiffness of sandwich structures is high, making it an attractive option for pressurized chambers. For the most part in sandwich structures, the strength of the material is maintained as compared to vascular networks. Also, material shows almost full recovery from damage.

===== Interconnected networks =====
Interconnected networks are more efficient than discrete channels, but are harder and more expensive to create. The most basic way to create these channels is to apply basic machining principles to create micro scale channel grooves. These techniques yield channels from 600 to 700 micrometers. This technique works great on the two-dimensional plane, but when trying to create a three-dimensional network, they are limited.

===== Direct ink writing =====
The Direct Ink Writing (DIW) technique is a controlled extrusion of viscoelastic inks to create three-dimensional interconnected networks. It works by first setting organic ink in a defined pattern. Then the structure is infiltrated with a material like an epoxy. This epoxy is then cured, and the ink can be sucked out with a modest vacuum, creating the hollow tubes.

===== Carbon nanotube networks =====
Through dissolving a linear polymer inside a solid three-dimensional epoxy matrix, so that they are miscible to each other, the linear polymer becomes mobile at a certain temperature When carbon nanotubes are also incorporated into epoxy material, and a direct current is run through the tubes, a significant shift in sensing curve indicates permanent damage to the polymer, thus 'sensing' a crack. When the carbon nanotubes sense a crack within the structure, they can be used as thermal transports to heat up the matrix so the linear polymers can diffuse to fill the cracks in the epoxy matrix. Thus healing the material.

===== SLIPS =====
A different approach was suggested by Prof. J. Aizenberg from Harvard University, who suggested to use Slippery Liquid-Infused Porous Surfaces (SLIPS), a porous material inspired by the carnivorous pitcher plant and filled with a lubricating liquid immiscible with both water and oil. SLIPS possess self-healing and self-lubricating properties as well as icephobicity and were successfully used for many purposes.

===== Sacrificial thread stitching =====
Organic threads (such as polylactide filament for example) are stitched through laminate layers of fiber reinforced polymer, which are then boiled and vacuumed out of the material after curing of the polymer, leaving behind empty channels than can be filled with healing agents.

== Self-healing fibre-reinforced polymer composites ==
Methods for the implementation of self-healing functionality into filled composites and fibre reinforced polymers (FRPs) are almost exclusively based on extrinsic systems and thus can be broadly classified into two approaches; discrete capsule-based systems and continuous vascular systems. In contrast to non-filled polymers, the success of an intrinsic approach based on bond reversibility has yet to be proven in FRPs. To date, self-healing of FRPs has mostly been applied to simple structures such as flat plates and panels. There is however a somewhat limited application of self-healing in flat panels, as access to the panel surface is relatively simple and repair methods are very well established in industry. Instead, there has been a strong focus on implementing self-healing in more complex and industrially relevant structures such as T-Joints and Aircraft Fuselages.

=== Capsule-based systems ===
The creation of a capsule-based system was first reported by White et al. in 2001, and this approach has since been adapted by a number of authors for introduction into fibre reinforced materials. This method relies on the release of an encapsulated healing agent into the damage zone, and is generally a once off process as the functionality of the encapsulated healing agent cannot be restored. Even so, implemented systems are able to restore material integrity to almost 100% and remain stable over the material lifetime.

=== Vascular systems ===
A vascular or fibre-based approach may be more appropriate for self-healing impact damage in fibre-reinforced polymer composite materials. In this method, a network of hollow channels known as vascules, similar to the blood vessels within human tissue, are placed within the structure and used for the introduction of a healing agent. During a damage event cracks propagate through the material and into the vascules causing them to be cleaved open. A liquid resin is then passed through the vascules and into the damage plane, allowing the cracks to be repaired. Vascular systems have a number of advantages over microcapsule based systems, such as the ability to continuously deliver large volumes of repair agents and the potential to be used for repeated healing. The hollow channels themselves can also be used for additional functionality, such as thermal management and structural health monitoring. A number of methods have been proposed for the introduction of these vascules, including the use of hollow glass fibres (HGFs), 3D printing, a "lost wax" process and a solid preform route.

== Self-healing coatings ==
Coatings allow the retention and improvement of bulk properties of a material. They can provide protection for a substrate from environmental exposure. Thus, when damage occurs (often in the form of microcracks), environmental elements like water and oxygen can diffuse through the coating and may cause material damage or failure. Microcracking in coatings can result in mechanical degradation or delamination of the coating, or in electrical failure in fibre-reinforced composites and microelectronics, respectively. As the damage is on such a small scale, repair, if possible, is often difficult and costly. Therefore, a coating that can automatically heal itself ("self-healing coating") could prove beneficial by automatic recovering properties (such as mechanical, electrical and aesthetic properties), and thus extending the lifetime of the coating. The majority of the approaches that are described in literature regarding self-healing materials can be applied to make "self-healing" coatings, including microencapsulation and the introduction of reversible physical bonds such as hydrogen bonding, ionomers and chemical bonds (Diels-Alder chemistry). Microencapsulation is the most common method to develop self-healing coatings. The capsule approach originally described by White et al., using microencapsulated dicyclopentadiene (DCPD) monomer and Grubbs' catalyst to self-heal epoxy polymer was later adapted to epoxy adhesive films that are commonly used in the aerospace and automotive industries for bonding metallic and composite substrates. Recently, microencapsulated liquid suspensions of metal or carbon black were used to restore electrical conductivity in a multilayer microelectronic device and battery electrodes respectively; however the use of microencapsulation for restoration of electrical properties in coatings is limited. Liquid metal microdroplets have also been suspended within silicone elastomer to create stretchable electrical conductors that maintain electrical conductivity when damaged, mimicking the resilience of soft biological tissue. The most common application of this technique is proven in polymer coatings for corrosion protection. Corrosion protection of metallic materials is of significant importance on an economical and ecological scale. To prove the effectiveness of microcapsules in polymer coatings for corrosion protection, researchers have encapsulated a number of materials. These materials include isocyanates monomers such as DCPD GMA epoxy resin, linseed oil and tung oil., and drugs. By using the aforementioned materials for self healing in coatings, it was proven that microencapsulation effectively protects the metal against corrosion and extends the lifetime of a coating.

Coatings in high temperature applications may be designed to exhibit self-healing performance through the formation of a glass. In such situations, such as high emissivity coatings, the viscosity of the glass formed determines the self healing ability of the coating, which may compete with defect formation due to oxidation or ablation. Silicate glass based self-healing materials are of particular value in thermal barrier coatings and towards space applications such as heat shields. Composite materials based on Molybdenum disilicide are the subject of various studies towards enhancing their glass-based self healing performance in coating applications.

== Self-healing cementitious materials ==
Cementitious materials have existed since the Roman era. These materials have a natural ability to self-heal, which was first reported by the French Academy of Science in 1836. This ability can be improved by the integration of chemical and biochemical strategies.

=== Autogenous healing ===
Autogenous healing is the natural ability of cementitious materials to repair cracks. This ability is principally attributed to further hydration of unhydrated cement particles and carbonation of dissolved calcium hydroxide. Cementitious materials in fresh-water systems can autogenously heal cracks up to 0.2 mm over a period of 7 weeks.

In order to promote autogenous healing and to close wider cracks, superabsorbent polymers can be added to a cementitious mixture. Addition of 1 m% of selected superabsorbent polymer versus cement to a cementitious material, stimulated further hydration with nearly 40% in comparison with a traditional cementitious material, if 1 h water contact per day was allowed.

=== Chemical additives based healing ===
Self-healing of cementitious materials can be achieved through the reaction of certain chemical agents. Two main strategies exist for housing these agents, namely capsules and vascular tubes. These capsules and vascular tubes, once ruptured, release these agents and heal the crack damage. Studies have mainly focused on improving the quality of these housings and encapsulated materials in this field.

=== Bio-based healing ===
According to a 1996 study by H. L. Erlich in Chemical Geology journal, the self-healing ability of concrete has been improved by the incorporation of bacteria, which can induce calcium carbonate precipitation through their metabolic activity. These precipitates can build up and form an effective seal against crack related water ingress. At the First International Conference on Self Healing Materials held in April, 2007 in The Netherlands, Henk M. Jonkers and Erik Schlangen presented their research in which they had successfully used the "alkaliphilic spore-forming bacteria" as a "self-healing agent in concrete". They were the first to incorporate bacteria within cement paste for the development of self-healing concrete. It was found that the bacteria directly added to the paste only remained viable for 4 months. Later studies saw Jonkers use expanded clay particles and Van Tittlelboom use glass tubes, to protect the bacteria inside the concrete. Other strategies to protect the bacteria have also since been reported.

== Self-healing ceramics ==
Generally, ceramics are superior in strength to metals at high temperatures, however, they are brittle and sensitive to flaws, and this brings into question their integrity and reliability as structural materials. $\ce{M_{\mathit n+1}AX_\mathit{n}}$ phase ceramics, also known as MAX Phases, can autonomously heal crack damage by an intrinsic healing mechanism. Micro cracks caused by wear or thermal stress are filled with oxides formed from the MAX phase constituents, commonly the A-element, during high temperature exposure to air. Crack gap filling was first demonstrated for Ti_{3}AlC_{2} by oxidation at 1200 °C in air. Ti_{2}AlC and Cr_{2}AlC have also demonstrated said ability, and more ternary carbides and nitrides are expected to be able to autonomously self-heal. The process is repeatable up to the point of element depletion, distinguishing MAX phases from other self-healing materials that require external healing agents (extrinsic healing) for single crack gap filling. Depending on the filling-oxide, improvement of the initial properties such as local strength can be achieved. On the other hand, mullite, alumina and zirconia do not have the ability to heal intrinsically, but could be endowed with self-healing capabilities by embedding second phase components into the matrix. Upon cracking, these particles are exposed to oxygen, and in the presence of heat, they react to form new materials which fill the crack gap under volume expansion. This concept has been proven using SiC to heal cracks in an Alumina matrix, and further studies have investigated the high temperature strength, and the static and cyclic fatigue strength of the healed part. The strength and bonding between the matrix and the healing agent are of prime importance and thus govern the selection of the healing particles.

== Self-healing metals ==
When exposed for long times to high temperatures and moderate stresses, metals exhibit premature and low-ductility creep fracture, arising from the formation and growth of cavities. Those defects coalesce into cracks which ultimately cause macroscopic failure. Self-healing of early stage damage is thus a promising new approach to extend the lifetime of the metallic components. In metals, self-healing is intrinsically more difficult to achieve than in most other material classes, due to their high melting point and, as a result, low atom mobility. Generally, defects in the metals are healed by the formation of precipitates at the defect sites that immobilize further crack growth. Improved creep and fatigue properties have been reported for underaged aluminium alloys compared to the peak hardening Al alloys, which is due to the heterogeneous precipitation at the crack tip and its plastic zone. The first attempts to heal creep damage in steels were focused on the dynamic precipitation of either Cu or BN at the creep-cavity surface. Cu precipitation has only a weak preference for deformation-induced defects as a large fraction of spherical Cu precipitates is simultaneously formed with the matrix. Recently, gold atoms were recognized as a highly efficient healing agents in Fe-based alloys. A defect-induced mechanism is indicated for the Au precipitation, i.e. the Au solute remains dissolved until defects are formed. Autonomous repair of high-temperature creep damage was reported by alloying with a small amount of Au. Healing agents selectively precipitate at the free surface of a creep cavity, resulting in pore filling. For the lower stress levels up to 80% filling of the creep cavities with Au precipitates is achieved resulting in a substantial increase in creep life time. Work to translate the concept of creep damage healing in simple binary or ternary model systems to real multicomponent creep steels is ongoing.

In 2023 the Sandia National Laboratories reported the finding of self-healing of fatigue cracks in metal and reported that the observations seems to confirm a 2013 study predicting the effect.

== Self-healing hydrogels ==
Hydrogels are soft solids consisting of a three dimensional network of natural or synthetic polymers with a high water content. Hydrogels based on non-covalent interactions or dynamic covalent chemistry can exhibit self-healing properties after cutting or breaking. Hydrogels that can fully fluidize followed by self-healing are of particular interest in biomedical engineering for the development of injectable hydrogels for tissue regeneration or 3D bioprinting inks.

== Self-healing organic dyes ==
Recently, several classes of organic dyes were discovered that self-heal after photo-degradation when doped in PMMA and other polymer matrices. This is also known as reversible photo-degradation. It was shown that, unlike common process like molecular diffusion, the mechanism is caused by dye-polymer interaction.

== Self-healing of ice ==
It has recently been shown that micrometer-sized defects in a pristine layer of ice heal spontaneously within a matter of several hours. The generated curvature by any defect causes a local increased vapor pressure and therefore enhances the volatility of the surface molecules. Hence, the mobility of the upper layer of water molecules increases significantly. The main mechanism, that dominates this healing effect is therefore sublimation from, and condensation onto the surface. This opposes earlier work that describes sintering of ice spheres by surface diffusion.

Measurement of a self-healing scratch with an initial depth of approximately 2.5 micrometers, induced in a pristine ice layer of 247 kelvin. Total healing time: 205 minutes.

== Further applications ==
Self-healing epoxies can be incorporated onto metals in order to prevent corrosion. A substrate metal showed major degradation and rust formation after 72 hours of exposure. But after being coated with the self-healing epoxy, there was no visible damage under SEM after 72 hours of the same exposure.

== Assessment of self-healing efficacy ==
Numerous methodologies for the assessment of self-healing capabilities have been developed for each material class (Table 1).

Table 1. Damaging methods for self-healing assessment of different classes of material.
| Material class | Damage mechanism | Healing |
|---|---|---|
| Polymers | Razor blade/scalpel cut; Tensile test with rupture; Ballistic impact | Autonomic healing supramolecular networks |
| Polymers | Razor blade/scalpel cut | Temperature triggered supramolecular networks |
| Fibre Reinforced Composite | Delamination BVID (Barely Visible Impact Damage) | Vascular self-healing; Microcapsule self-healing |
| Coatings | Microcutting with corrosion; Corrosion/erosion; Pull-out tests (adhesion); Microscratching | Molecular inter-diffusion (solvent); Encapsulated agent |
| Concrete | Crack initiation by bending compression | Activation of microencapsulated agent |
| Ceramic | Crack initiation by indentation | Temperature triggered oxidation reaction |
| Ceramic coating | Crack initiation by indentation | Temperature triggered oxidation reaction |
| Polyurethane foam coating | Puncturing with a spike | Reduction of the effective leakage area by negative strains pushing the walls of the fissure in the foam coatings to one another. |

Hence, when self-healing is assessed, different parameters need to be considered: type of stimulus (if any), healing time, maximum amount of healing cycles the material can tolerate, and degree of recovery, all whilst considering the material's virgin properties. This typically takes account of relevant physical parameters such as tensile modulus, elongation at break, fatigue-resistance, barrier properties, colour and transparency. The self-healing ability of a given material generally refers to the recovery of a specific property relative to the virgin material, designated as the self-healing efficiency. The self-healing efficiency can be quantified by comparing the respective experimental value obtained for the undamaged virgin sample (f_{virgin}) with the healed sample (f_{healed}) (eq. 1)

| η = f_{healed}/f_{virgin} | 1 |

In a variation of this definition that is relevant to extrinsic self-healing materials, the healing efficiency takes into consideration the modification of properties caused by introducing the healing agent. Accordingly, the healed sample property is compared to that of an undamaged control equipped with self-healing agent f_{non-healed} (equation 2).

| η = f_{healed}/(f_{non-healed}) | 2 |

For a certain property Pi of a specific material, an optimal self-healing mechanism and process is characterized by the full restoration of the respective material property after a suitable, normalized damaging process. For a material where 3 different properties are assessed, it should be determined 3 efficiencies given as ƞ_{1}(P_{1}), ƞ_{2}(P_{2}) and ƞ_{3}(P_{3}). The final average efficiency based on a number n of properties for a self-healing material is accordingly determined as the harmonic mean given by equation 3. The harmonic mean is more appropriate than the traditional arithmetic mean, as it is less sensitive to large outliers.

== Commercialization ==
At least two companies are attempting to bring the newer applications of self-healing materials to the market. Arkema, a leading chemicals company, announced in 2009 the beginning of industrial production of self-healing elastomers. As of 2012, Autonomic Materials Inc., had raised over three million US dollars.
