= Smart rubber =

Self-healing polymer material

Smart rubber is a polymeric material that is able to "heal" when torn. Near room temperature this process is reversible and can be cycled several times. Supramolecular self-healing rubber can be processed, re-used, and ultimately recycled. The edges of a tear can be held together, and they will simply re-bond into apparent solidity. This is done by utilizing a hydrogen-bonding polymer, rather than producing a material whose structure would depend on covalent bonding and ionic bonding between chains, which is typical of normal rubber. In this case hydrogen bonding can occur simply by pressing two faces of the substance together, allowing the recovery of a continuous hydrogen bonding network.

== Hydrogen bonding networks ==
Smart rubber will recover its original mechanical strength within several hours of being split and then subsequently recombined. Residual hydrogen bond donors and acceptors responsible for the self-healing properties of the elastomer remain unpaired until the newly exposed surface comes in contact with another complementary surface, allowing formation of new intermolecular hydrogen bonds.

== Comparisons with conventional rubber ==
When compared to rubber, which is covalently cross-linked, smart rubber cannot continually hold mechanical stress without undergoing gradual plastic deformation, and strain recovery is typically slow.

== See also ==
- Ludwik Leibler (inventor of smart rubber)
- Smart polymer
