= Polyimine =

Type of polymer material

Polyimines are classified as polymer materials that contain imine groups, which are characterised by a double bond between a carbon and nitrogen atom. The term polyimine can also be found occasionally in covalent organic frameworks (COFs). In (older) literature, polyimines are sometimes also referred to as poly(azomethine) or polyschiff.

== Synthesis ==
Polyimines can be synthesised via a condensation reaction between aldehydes and (primary) amines. During this reaction, water is also formed as byproduct. Often, the synthesis can be performed at room temperature, but to fully cure the materials and remove remaining water, they can be dried at slightly elevated temperatures and/or in vacuum.

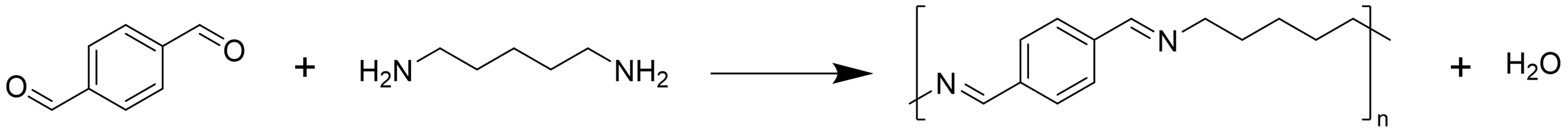
Synthesis of a polyimine from terephthalaldehyde and cadaverine.

== Applications ==
One of the applications of polyimines is as in covalent adaptable networks (CANs). These are polymer materials that are crosslinked via dynamic covalent bonds. Besides polyimines, other types of dynamic covalent chemistry can also be used. Polyimine CANs are largely investigated to create recyclable and self-healing thermoset materials, but they can also find use in composite materials with higher performance.

Flame retardants

Because of the free radical scavenging properties of imines, they are well fit to be used in flame retardant materials. In addition, different polyimine materials have also been investigated for which phosporous species have been incorporated. These materials represent more sustainable and less harmful alternatives to previously used halogenated polymers.

Sensory devices

The dynamic characteristics of polyimines enables them to be used as sensory devices. An example of this is the sensing of amine compounds. Polyimine materials have been constructed that enable penetration of (small) monoamine molecules. These amines can perform bond exchange reactions with the polyimine network, and as a result reduce the crosslinking density. As a result, the materials soften or even liquify. The change in material properties provides a "read-out" of the presence of amines.

Electronic skin

Polyimines have been investigated for their use in the production of electronic skins (e-skin). For this, Polyimine networks were doped with conductive silver nanoparticles. The malleability of the polyimine network enables the e-skin to conform to complex or uneven surfaces without introducing excessive interfacial stresses.

== Bio-based polyimines ==
Various studies have been conducted to synthesise bio-based polyimines due the great natural abundance of aldehydes and amines. Popular sources for aldehydes include vanilin, which can be obtained from lignin, or 2,5-furandicarboxaldehyde (FDC), which can be derived from fructose.

== Imines in other polymers ==
Apart from polyimine polymers that are formed directly via the condensation reaction from aldehydes and amines, it is also possible to incorporate imines in other existing polymer materials. Imines have, for example, been incorporated into recyclable epoxy-based thermosets and polyesters.

== Confusion in nomenclature ==
Polyimines are commonly abbreviated as PI. However, the same abbreviation is typically used for polyimide. Which has almost the same name, but is a significantly different type of polymer material.

Sometimes the term polyimine is used to describe a material called polyethyleneimine. This material exists in different forms (i.e., linear or branched), but does in fact not contain actual imine (C=N) bonds.

== See also ==
- Imine
- Polyimide
- Polyamide
- Vitrimers
- Covalent adaptable network (CAN)
