= Terephthalaldehyde =

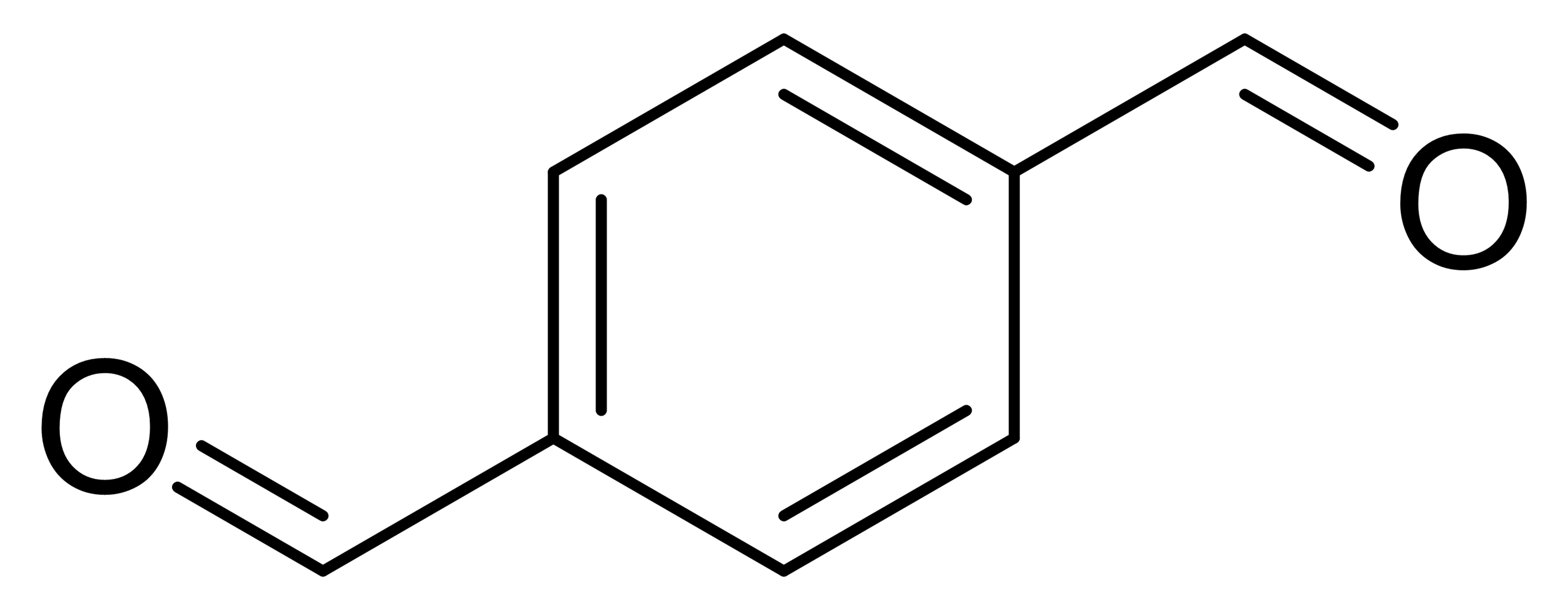

Names
- Other names 1,4-Benzenedialdehyde; 1,4-Diformylbenzene

Identifiers
CAS Number	623-27-8
3D model (JSmol)	Interactive image
ChemSpider	11673
ECHA InfoCard	100.009.805
EC Number	210-784-8
PubChem CID	12173
UNII	M2Y6E4N2TS
CompTox Dashboard (EPA)	DTXSID6060769
- InChI: InChI=1S/C8H6O2/c9-5-7-1-2-8(6-10)4-3-7/h1-6H Key: KUCOHFSKRZZVRO-UHFFFAOYSA-N
- SMILES: C1=CC(=CC=C1C=O)C=O

Properties
Chemical formula	C_{8}H_{6}O_{2}
Molar mass	134.134 g·mol^{−1}
Appearance	white to beige
Density	1.06 g/mL
Melting point	114–117 °C (237–243 °F; 387–390 K)
Boiling point	245-248

Hazards
- GHS labelling
Pictograms	(GHS06: Toxic) (GHS07: Exclamation mark)
Signal word	Danger
Hazard statements	H302, H311, H315, H319, H335
Precautionary statements	P261, P280, P304+P340, P305+P351+P338, P405, P501
Flash point	76 °C
- Except where otherwise noted, data are given for materials in their standard state (at 25 °C [77 °F], 100 kPa). Infobox references

Terephthalaldehyde (TA) is an organic compound with the formula C_{6}H_{4}(CHO)_{2}. It is one of three isomers of benzene dicarboxaldehyde, in which the aldehyde moieties are positioned in the para conformation on the benzene ring. Terephthalaldehyde appears as a white to beige solid, typically in the form of a powder. It is soluble in many organic solvents, such as alcohols (e.g., methanol or ethanol) and ethers (e.g., tetrahydrofuran or diethylether).

== Preparation ==
Terepthalaldehyde can be synthesised from p-xylene in two steps. First, p-xylene can be reacted with bromine to create α,α,α',α'-Tetrabromo-p-xylene. Next, sulphuric acid is introduced to create terephthaldehyde. Alternative procedures also describe the conversion of similar p-xylene derivatives into terephthalaldehyde.

== Reactions and applications ==
Terphthalaldehyde is used in the preparation of imines, which are also commonly referred to as Schiff bases, following a condensation reaction with amines. During this reaction, water is also formed. This reaction is by definition reversible, thus creating an equilibrium between aldehyde and amine on one side, and the imine and water on the other. However, due to aromatic conjugation between the imine group and benzene ring, the imines are relatively stable and will not easily hydrolyse back to the aldehyde. When in an acidic aqueous environment, however, imines will start to hydrolyse more easily. Typically, an equilibrium between the imine and aldehyde is formed, which is dependent on the concentration of the relevant compounds and the pH of the solution.

Imines from terephthalaldehyde find use in the preparation of metal-organic coordination complexes. In addition, terepthaldehyde is a commonly used monomer in the production of imine polymers, also called polyimines. It finds further use in the synthesis of covalent organic frameworks (COFs), and It is used as a precursor for the preparation of paramagnetic microporous polymeric organic frameworks (POFs) through copolymerization with pyrrole, indole, and carbazole. Due to the characteristic metal-coordinating properties of imines, terephthalaldehyde finds common use in synthesis of molecular cages.

Terephthalaldehyde is also a commonly used intermediate or starting material in the preparation of a broad variety of organic compounds, such as pharmaceuticals, dyes and fluorescent whitening agents.

== Related compounds ==
- phthalaldehyde
- isophthalaldehyde
- terephthalic acid
