= Vitrimers =

Class of plastics

Vitrimers are a class of plastics, which are derived from thermosetting polymers (thermosets) and are very similar to them. Vitrimers consist of molecular, covalent networks, which can change their topology by thermally activated bond-exchange reactions. At high temperatures, they can flow like viscoelastic liquids; at low temperatures, the bond-exchange reactions are immeasurably slow (frozen), and the Vitrimers behave like classical thermosets at this point. Vitrimers are strong glass formers. Their behavior opens new possibilities in the application of thermosets, such as a self-healing material or simple processibility in a wide temperature range.

Besides epoxy resins based on diglycidyl ether of bisphenol A, other polymer networks have been used to produce vitrimers, such as aromatic polyesters, polylactic acid (polylactide), polyhydroxyurethanes, epoxidized soybean oil with citric acid, and polybutadiene. Vitrimers were termed as such in the early 2010s by French researcher Ludwik Leibler from the CNRS.

== Background and significance ==
Thermoplastics are easy to process, but corrode easily by chemicals and mechanical stress, while the opposite is true of thermosets. These differences arise from how the polymer chains are held together.

Historically, thermoset polymer systems that were processable by virtue of topology changes within the covalent networks as mediated by bond exchange reactions were also developed by James Economy's group at UIUC in the 1990s including consolidation of thermoset composite laminae. As well, the Economy group conducted studies employing secondary ion mass spectrometry (SIMS) on deuterated and undeuterated fully cured vitrimer layers to discriminate the length scales (<50 nm) for physical interdiffusion between vitrimers constituent atoms – providing evidence towards eliminating physical interdiffusion of the polymer chains as the governing mechanism for bonding between vitrimer layers.

Thermoplastics are made of covalent bond molecule chains, which are held together by weak interactions (e.g., van der Waals forces). The weak intermolecular interactions lead to easy processing by melting (or in some cases also from solution), but also make the polymer susceptible to solvent degradation and to creep under constant load. Thermoplastics can be deformed irreversibly above their glass-transition temperature or their crystalline melting point and be processed by extrusion, injection molding, and welding.

Thermosets, on the other hand, are made of molecular chains which are interconnected by covalent bonds to form a stable network. Thus, they have outstanding mechanical properties and thermal and chemical resistance. They are an indispensable part of structural components in automotive and aircraft industries. Due to their irreversible linking by covalent bonds, molding is not possible once the polymerization is completed. Therefore, they must be polymerized in the desired shape, which is time-consuming, restricts the shape and is responsible for their high price.

Given this, if the chains can be held together with reversible, strong covalent bonds, the resultant polymer would have the advantages of both thermoplastics and thermosets, including high processability, repairability, and performance. Vitrimers combine the desirable properties of both classes: they have the mechanical and thermal properties of thermosets and can be also molded under the influence of heat. Vitrimers can be welded like silicon glasses or metals. Welding by simple heating allows the creation of complex objects. Vitrimers could thus be a new and promising class of materials with many uses.

The term vitrimer was created by the French researcher Ludwik Leibler, head of laboratory at CNRS, France's national research institute. In 2011, Leibler and co-workers developed silica-like networks using the well-established transesterification reaction of epoxy and fatty dicarboxylic or tricarboxylic acids. The synthesized networks have both hydroxyl and ester groups, which undergo exchange reactions (transesterifications) at high temperatures, resulting in the ability of stress relaxation and malleability of the material. On the other hand, the exchange reactions are suppressed to a great extent when the networks are cooled down, leading to a behavior like a soft solid. This whole process is based only on exchange reactions, which is the main difference from that of thermoplastics.

== Functional principle ==
=== Glass and glass former ===
If the melt of an (organic) amorphous polymer is cooled down, it solidifies at the glass-transition temperature T_{g}. On cooling, the hardness of the polymer increases in the neighborhood of T_{g} by several orders of magnitude. This hardening follows the Williams-Landel-Ferry equation, not the Arrhenius equation. Organic polymers are thus called fragile glass formers. Silicon glass (e.g., window glass), is in contrast labelled as a strong glass former. Its viscosity changes only very slowly in the vicinity of the glass-transition point T_{g} and follows the Arrhenius law. This is what permits glassblowing. If one would try to shape an organic polymer in the same manner as glass, it would at first firmly and fully liquefy very slightly above T_{g}. For a theoretical glassblowing of organic polymers, the temperature must be controlled very precisely.

Until 2010, no organic strong glass formers were known. Strong glass formers can be shaped in the same way as glass (silicon dioxide) can be. Vitrimers are the first such material discovered, which can behave like viscoelastic fluid at high temperatures. Unlike classical polymer melts, whose flow properties are largely dependent on friction between monomers, vitrimers become a viscoelastic fluid because of exchange reactions at high temperatures as well as monomer friction. These two processes have different activation energies, resulting in a wide range of viscosity variation. Moreover, because the exchange reactions follow Arrhenius' Law, the change of viscosity of vitrimers also follows an Arrhenius relationship with the increase of temperature, differing greatly from conventional organic polymers.

=== Effect of transesterification and temperature influence ===
The research group led by Ludwik Leibler demonstrated the operating principle of vitrimers at the example of epoxy thermosets. Epoxy thermosets can be represented as vitrimers, when transesterification reactions can be introduced and controlled. In the studied system, carboxylic acids or carboxylic acid anhydrides must be used as hardeners. A topology change is possible by transesterification reactions which do not affect the number of links or the (average) functionality of the polymer, meaning that neither the decomposition of polymer linkages nor the decrease of integrity of polymers happens when transesterification reactions take place. Thus, the polymer can flow like a viscoelastic liquid at high temperatures. During the cooling phase, the transesterification reactions are slowed down, until they finally freeze (be immeasurably slow). Below this point vitrimers behave like normal, classical thermosets. The shown case-study polymers showed an elastic modulus of 1 MPa to 100 MPa, depending on the bonding network density.

The concentration of ester groups in vitrimers is shown to have a huge influence on the rate of transesterification reactions. In the work done by Hillmyer, et al., about polylactide vitrimers, they demonstrated that the more ester groups present in the polymer, the faster the rates of relaxation will be, leading to better self-healing performance. Polylactide vitrimers which are synthesized by cross linking reactions of hydroxylterminated 4-arm star-shaped poly((±)-lactide) (HTSPLA) and methylenediphenyl diisocyanate (MDI) with the presence of cross-linking and transesterification catalyst stannous(II) octoate [Sn(Oct)_{2}], have many more ester groups than all previous vitrimers; therefore, this material has a significantly high stress relaxing rate compared to other polyester based vitrimer systems.

=== Fatigue and fracture behaviors of vitrimers ===
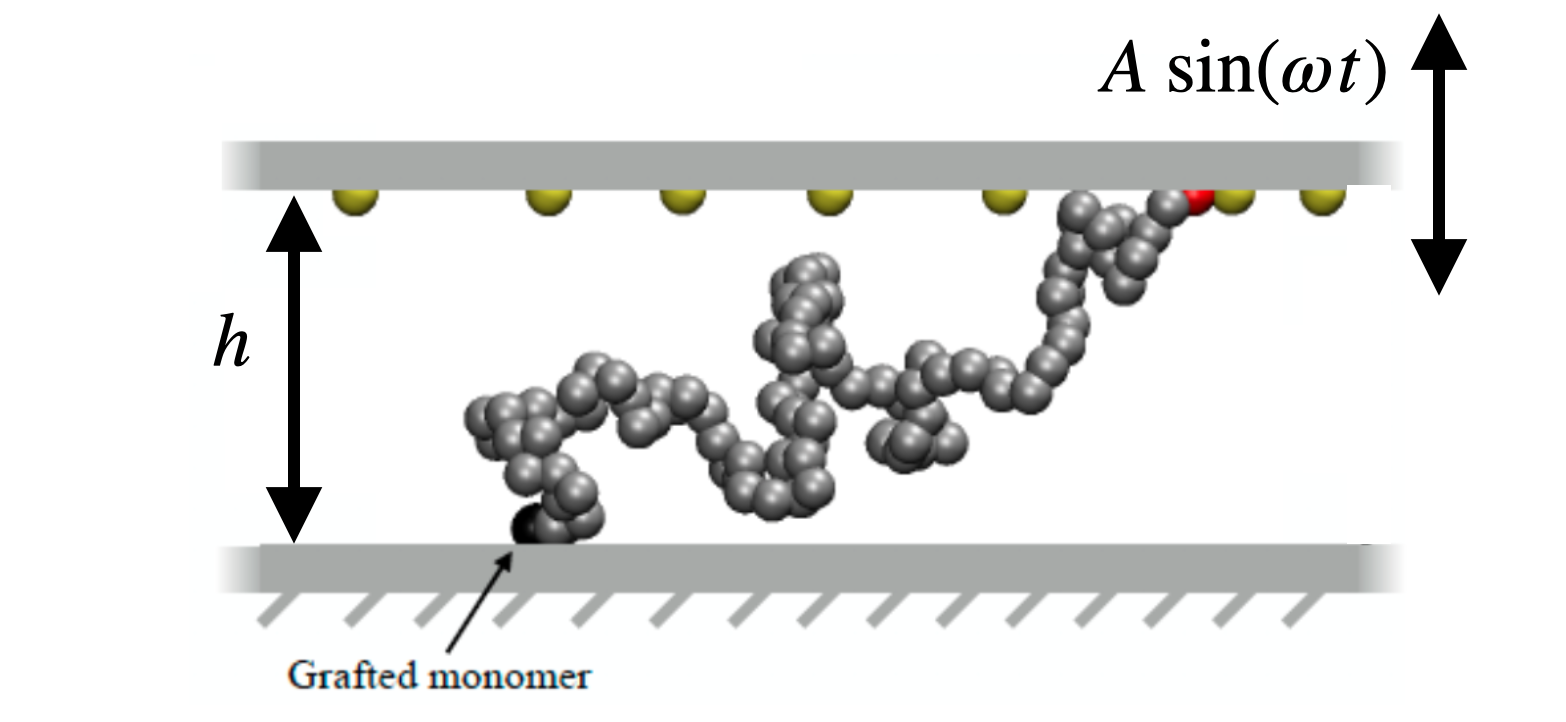
The polymer chain under confinement and oscillatory oscillations. The chain resembles the polymer at the interface of a crack in vitrimers.

Using polymer scaling laws and the segmental relaxation of a chain, one can relate the kinetics of bond breaking (binding time $T_b$) to the frequency $\omega$, amplitude $A$ of the excitation and the friction coefficient $\gamma$ of embedded matrix,

$T_{b} \sim e^{-\frac{z(\omega)\gamma A\omega}{k_BT}}$

Here, $z(\omega)$ is the number of unrelaxed monomer at the fracture interface and $k_BT$ is the thermal energy. Using Rouse relaxation time and a single grafted chain at the interface, one can show that $z(\omega)=\sqrt{3/4}(\omega\gamma)^{-1/2}$.

== Applications ==
There are many uses imaginable on this basis. A surfboard made of vitrimers could be brought into a new shape, scratches on a car body could be cured and cross-linked plastic or synthetic rubber items could be welded. Vitrimers, which are prepared from metathesis of dioxaborolanes with different commercially available polymers, can have both good processibility and outstanding performance, such as mechanical, thermal, and chemical resistance. The polymers that can be utilized in such methodology range from poly(methylmethacrylate), polyimine, polystyrene, to polyethylene with high density and cross-linked robust structures, which makes this preparative method of vitrimers able to be applied to a wide range of industries. Single wall carbon nanotubes (SWCNTs) have also been investigated as conductive fillers for vitrimer-based electromagnetic interference (EMI) shielding materials. A 2026 study of an epoxy vitrimer nanocomposite reported an EMI shielding effectiveness of 45.9 dB with 3 wt.% SWCNTs. A composite containing 1 wt.% SWCNTs recovered nearly 80% of its original shielding effectiveness after being mechanically broken down and reprocessed. Recent NASA-funded work on reversible adhesives for in-space assembly has used a high-performance vitrimer system called aromatic thermosetting copolyester (ATSP) as the basis for coatings and composites reversibly bondable in the solid state – providing new possibilities for the assembly of large, complex structures for space exploration and development. Start-up Mallinda Inc. claims to have applications across the composites market from wind energy, sporting goods, automotive, aerospace, marine, and carbon fiber reinforced pressure vessels among others.

== See also ==
- Dynamic covalent chemistry
- Covalent adaptable network
