= Benzophenone imine =

Names
- Preferred IUPAC name Diphenylmethanimine

Identifiers
CAS Number	1013-88-3
3D model (JSmol)	Interactive image
ChemSpider	120561
ECHA InfoCard	100.103.715
EC Number	600-205-0; 440-870-2
PubChem CID	136809
UNII	EJJ21NA7VI
CompTox Dashboard (EPA)	DTXSID10870832
- InChI: InChI=1S/C13H11N/c14-13(11-7-3-1-4-8-11)12-9-5-2-6-10-12/h1-10,14H Key: SXZIXHOMFPUIRK-UHFFFAOYSA-N
- SMILES: C1=CC=C(C=C1)C(=N)C2=CC=CC=C2

Properties
Chemical formula	C_{13}H_{11}N
Molar mass	181.238 g·mol^{−1}

Hazards
- GHS labelling
Pictograms	(GHS07: Exclamation mark)
Signal word	Warning
Hazard statements	H315, H319, H335
Precautionary statements	P261, P264, P271, P280, P302+P352, P304+P340, P305+P351+P338, P312, P321, P332+P313, P337+P313, P362, P403+P233, P405, P501
- Except where otherwise noted, data are given for materials in their standard state (at 25 °C [77 °F], 100 kPa). Infobox references

Benzophenone imine is an organic compound with the formula of (C_{6}H_{5})_{2}C=NH. A pale yellow liquid, benzophenone imine is used as a reagent in organic synthesis.

== Synthesis ==
Benzophenone imine can be prepared by the thermal decomposition of benzophenone oxime:

2 (C_{6}H_{5})_{2}C=NOH → (C_{6}H_{5})_{2}C=NH + (C_{6}H_{5})_{2}C=O

Benzophenone imine can also be synthesized by addition of phenylmagnesium bromide to benzonitrile followed by careful hydrolysis (lest the imine be hydrolyzed):

C_{6}H_{5}CN + C_{6}H_{5}MgBr → (C_{6}H_{5})_{2}C=NMgBr
(C_{6}H_{5})_{2}C=NMgBr + H_{2}O → (C_{6}H_{5})_{2}C=NH + MgBr(OH)

This method is known as Moureu-Mignonac ketimine synthesis. Yet another route to benzophenone imine involves reaction of benzophenone and ammonia.

== Reactions ==
Benzophenone imine undergoes deprotonation with alkyl lithium reagents.

(C_{6}H_{5})_{2}C=NH + CH_{3}Li → (C_{6}H_{5})_{2}C=NLi + CH_{4}
(C_{6}H_{5})_{2}C=NLi + CH_{3}I → (C_{6}H_{5})_{2}C=NCH_{3} + LiI

Primary amines can be protected as benzophenone imines, and the protected amines are stable in flash chromatography.

Buchwald-Hartwig amination involves coupling aromatic halide and amine to form carbon-nitrogen bonds with the help of palladium-based catalysts. Benzophenone imine can be used as an ammonia-equivalent in such reactions.
