= Dynamic covalent chemistry =

Method of synthesizing supramolecular assemblies

Dynamic covalent chemistry (DCvC or DCC) is a synthetic strategy employed by chemists to make complex molecular and supramolecular assemblies from discrete molecular building blocks. DCvC has allowed access to complex assemblies such as covalent organic frameworks, molecular knots, polymers, and novel macrocycles. Not to be confused with dynamic combinatorial chemistry, DCvC concerns only covalent bonding interactions. As such, it only encompasses a subset of supramolecular chemistries.

The underlying idea is that rapid equilibration allows the coexistence of a variety of different species among which molecules can be selected with desired chemical, pharmaceutical and biological properties. For instance, the addition of a proper template will shift the equilibrium toward the component that forms the complex of higher stability (thermodynamic template effect). After the new equilibrium is established, the reaction conditions are modified to stop equilibration. The optimal binder for the template is then extracted from the reactional mixture by the usual laboratory procedures. The property of self-assembly and error-correcting that allow DCvC to be useful in supramolecular chemistry rely on the dynamic property.

== Dynamic systems ==
Dynamic systems are collections of discrete molecular components that can reversibly assemble and disassemble. Systems may include multiple interacting species leading to competing reactions.

== Thermodynamic control ==
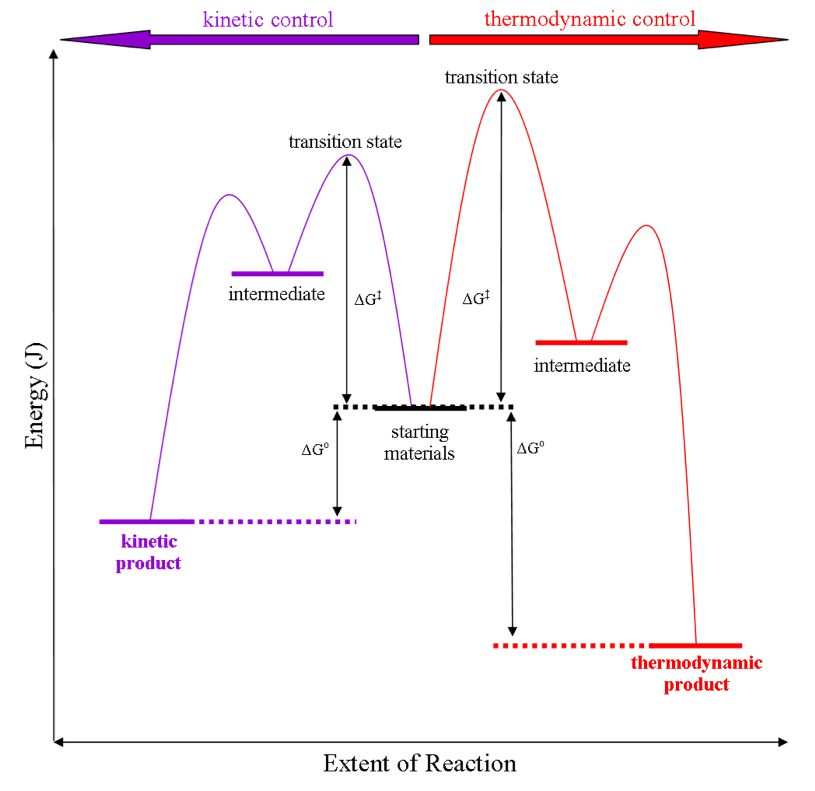
Figure 1: Thermodynamic versus Kinetic Control

In dynamic reaction mixtures, multiple products exist in equilibrium. Reversible assembly of molecular components generates products and semi-stable intermediates. Reactions can proceed along kinetic or thermodynamic pathways. Initial concentrations of kinetic intermediates are greater than thermodynamic products because the lower barrier of activation (ΔG‡), compared to the thermodynamic pathway, gives a faster rate of formation. A kinetic pathway is represented in figure 1 as a purple energy diagram. With time, the intermediates equilibrate towards the global minimum, corresponding to the lowest overall Gibbs free energy (ΔG°), shown in red on the reaction diagram in figure 1. The driving force for products to re-equilibrate towards the most stable products is referred to as thermodynamic control. The ratio of products to at any equilibrium state is determined by the relative magnitudes of free energy of the products. This relationship between population and relative energies is called the Maxwell-Boltzmann distribution.

== Thermodynamic template effect ==
The concept of a thermodynamic template is demonstrated in scheme 1. A thermodynamic template is a reagent that can stabilize the form of one product over others by lowering its Gibb's free energy (ΔG°) in relation to other products. cyclophane C2 can be prepared by the irreversible highly diluted reaction of a diol with chlorobromomethane in the presence of sodium hydride. The dimer however is part of series of equilibria between polyacetal macrocycles of different size brought about by acid catalyzed (triflic acid) transacetalization. Regardless of the starting material, C2, C4 or a high molar mass product, the equilibrium will eventually produce a product distribution across many macrocycles and oligomers. In this system it is possible to amplify the presence of C2 in the mixture when the transacetalisation catalyst is silver triflate because the silver ion fits ideally and irreversibly in the C2 cavity.

Scheme 1: Thermodynamic Template in macrocycle synthesis

== Synthetic methods ==
Reactions used in DCvC must generate thermodynamically stable products to overcome the entropic cost of self-assembly. The reactions must form covalent linkages between building blocks. Finally, all possible intermediates must be reversible, and the reaction ideally proceeds under conditions that are tolerant of functional groups elsewhere in the molecule.

Reactions that can be used in DCvC are diverse and can be placed into two general categories. Exchange reactions involve the substitution of one reaction partner in an intermolecular reaction for another with an identical type of bonding. Some examples of this are shown in schemes 5 and 8, in an ester exchange, and disulfide exchange reactions. The second type, formation reactions, rely on the formation of new covalent bonds. Some examples include Diels–Alder and aldol reactions. In some cases, a reaction can pertain to both categories. For example, Schiff base formation can be categorized as a forming new covalent bonds between a carbonyl and primary amine. However, in the presence of two different amines the reaction becomes an exchange reaction where the two imine derivatives compete in equilibrium.

Exchange and formation reactions can be further broken down into three categories:

1. Bonding between carbon–carbon
2. Bonding between carbon–heteroatom
3. Bonding between heteroatom–heteroatom

=== Carbon–carbon ===
Bond formation between carbon atoms forms very thermodynamically stable products. Therefore, they often require the use of a catalyst to improve kinetics and ensure reversibility.

==== Aldol reactions ====
Aldol reactions are commonly used in organic chemistry to form carbon-to-carbon bonds. The aldehyde-alcohol motif common to the reaction product is ubiquitous to synthetic chemistry and natural products. The reaction utilizes two carbonyl compounds to generate a β-hydroxy carbonyl. Catalysis is always necessary because the barrier of activation between kinetic products and starting materials makes the dynamic reversible process too slow. Catalysts that have been successfully employed include enzymatic aldolase and Al_{2}O_{3} based systems.

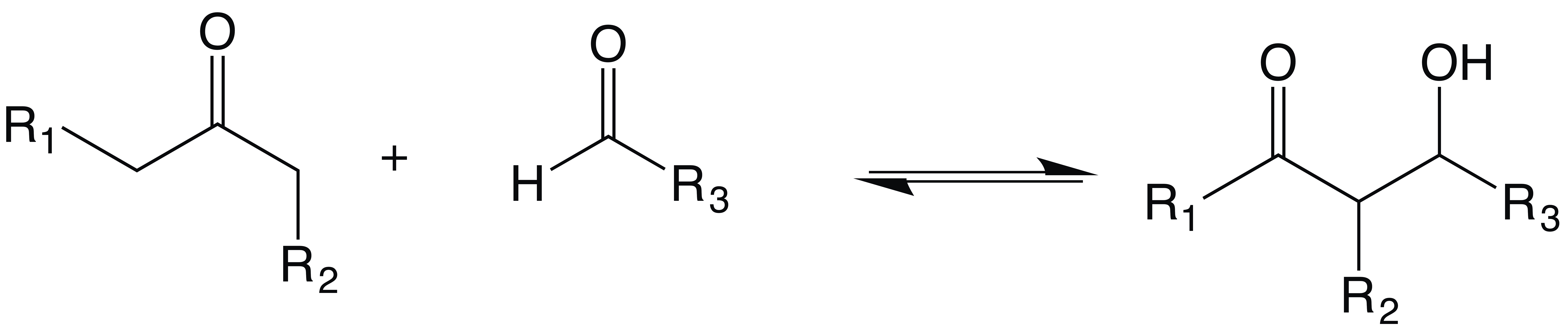
Scheme 2: Aldol formation from a ketone and an aldehyde

==== Diels–Alder ====
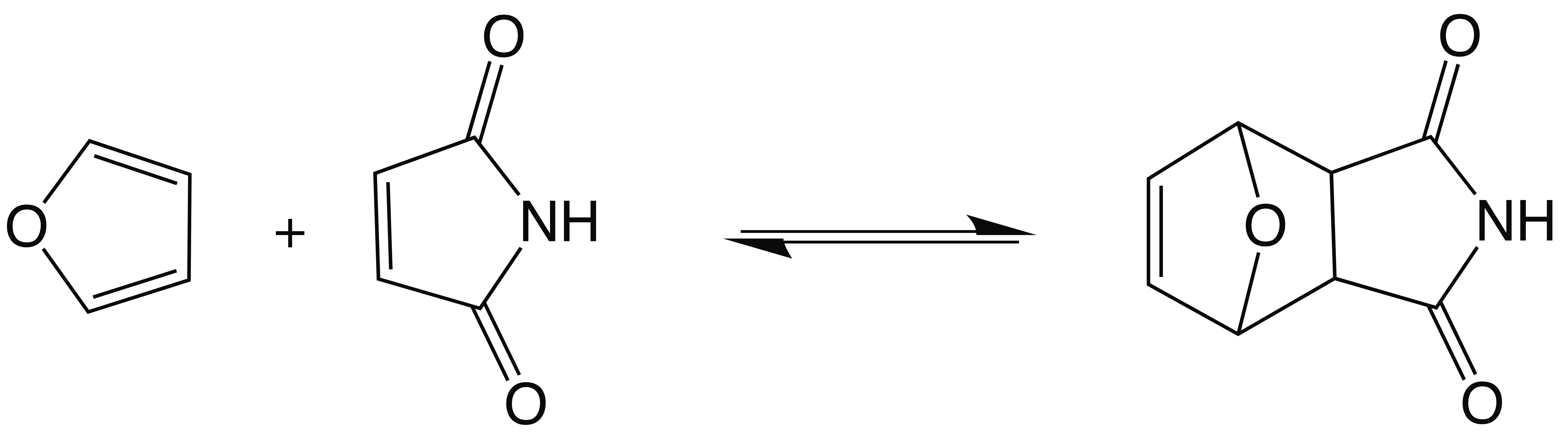
Scheme 3: [4+2] cycloaddition between furan and maleimide

[4+2] cycloadditions of a diene and an alkene have been used as DCvC reactions. These reactions are often reversible at high temperatures. In the case of furan–maleimide adducts, the retro-cycloaddition is accessible at temperatures as low as 40 °C.

==== Metathesis ====
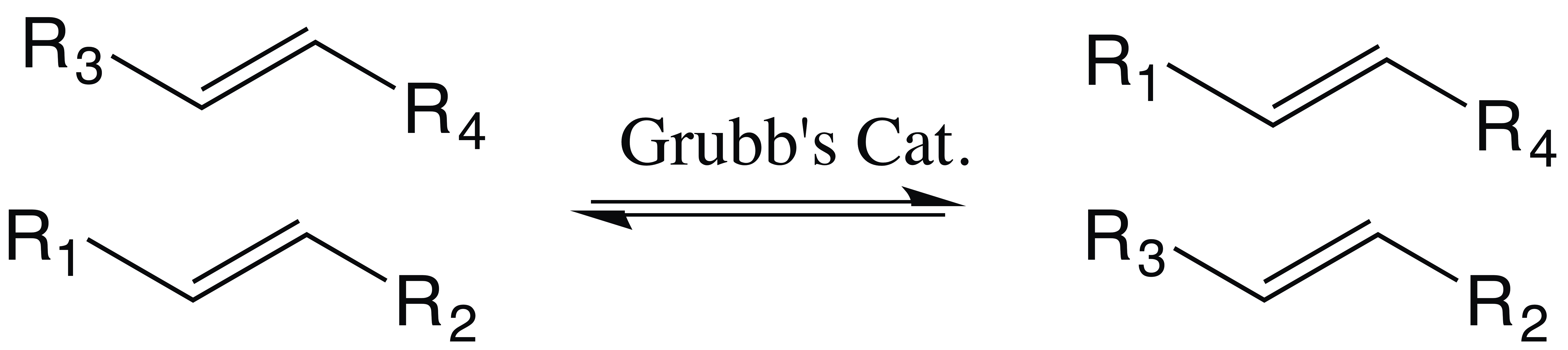
Scheme 4: Olefin Metathesis via Grubb's catalyst

Olefin and alkyne metathesis refers to a carbon–carbon bond forming reaction. In the case of olefin metathesis, the bond forms between two sp^{2}-hybridized carbon centers. In alkyne metathesis it forms between two sp-hybridized carbon centers. Ring opening metathesis polymerization (ROMP) can be used in polymerization and macrocycle synthesis.

=== Carbon–heteroatom ===
A common dynamic covalent building motif is bond formation between a carbon center and a heteroatom such as nitrogen or oxygen. Because the bond formed between carbon and a heteroatom is less stable than a carbon-carbon bond, they offer more reversibility and reach thermodynamic equilibrium faster than carbon bond forming dynamic covalent reactions.

==== Ester exchange ====
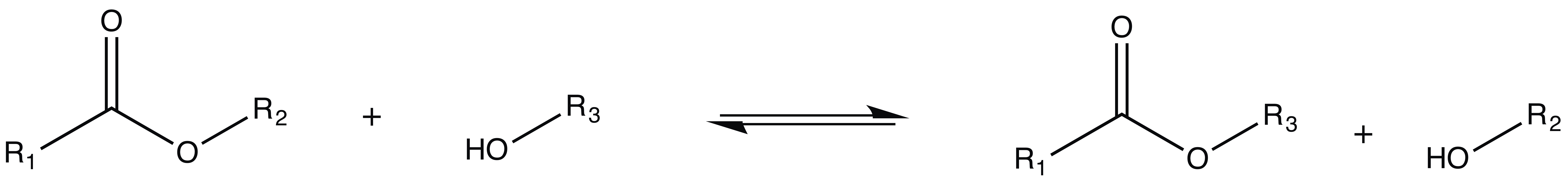
Scheme 5: Ester exchange with an alcohol

Ester exchange takes place between an ester carbonyl and an alcohol. Reverse esterification can take place via hydrolysis. This method has been used extensively in polymer synthesis.

==== Imine, aminal and hydrazone formation ====
Bond forming reactions between carbon and nitrogen are the most widely used in dynamic covalent chemistry. They have been used more broadly in materials chemistry for molecular switches, covalent organic frameworks, covalent adaptable networks and in self-sorting systems.

Imine formation takes place between an aldehyde or ketone and a primary amine, and when this primary amine is replaced by a hydrazine, it leads to the formation of a hydrazone. Similarly, aminal formation takes place between an aldehyde or ketone and a vicinal secondary amine. All of these reactions are commonly used in DCvC. While both reactions can initially be categorized as formation reactions, in the presence of one or more of either reagent, the dynamic equilibrium between carbonyl and amine becomes an exchange reaction. The equilibrium is also affected by the chemical groups next to the formed imine bond.

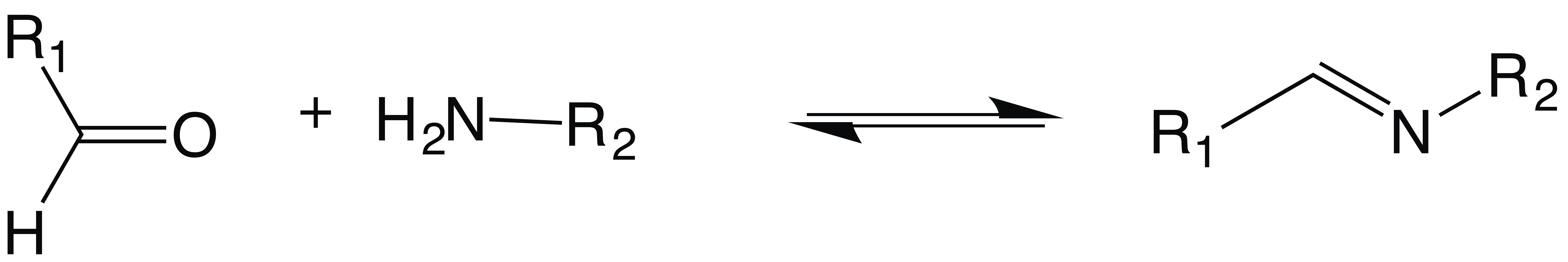
Scheme 6: Imine formation between an aldehyde and an amine

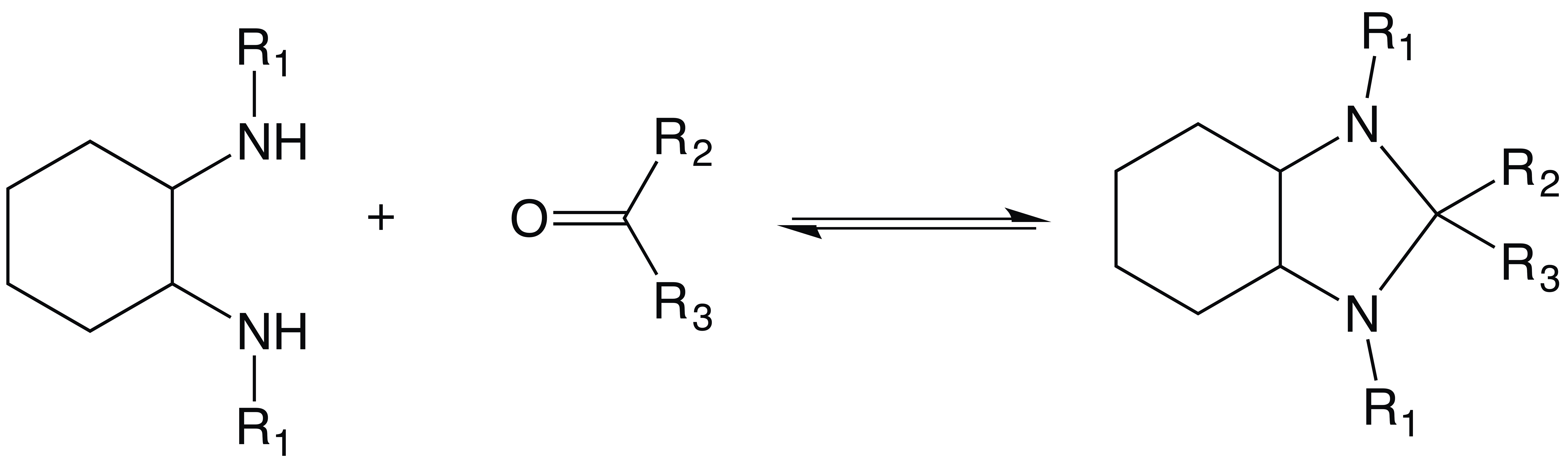
Scheme 7: Aminal formation between a ketone and two secondary amines

=== Heteroatom–heteroatom ===
Dynamic heteroatom bond formation, presents useful reactions in the dynamic covalent reaction toolbox. Boronic acid condensation (BAC) and disulfide exchange constitute the two main reactions in this category.

==== Disulfide exchange ====
Disulfides can undergo dynamic exchange reactions with free thiols. The reaction is well documented within the realm of DCvC, and is one of the first reactions demonstrated to have dynamic properties. The application of disulfide chemistry has the added advantage of being a biological motif. Cysteine residues can form disulfide bonds in natural systems.

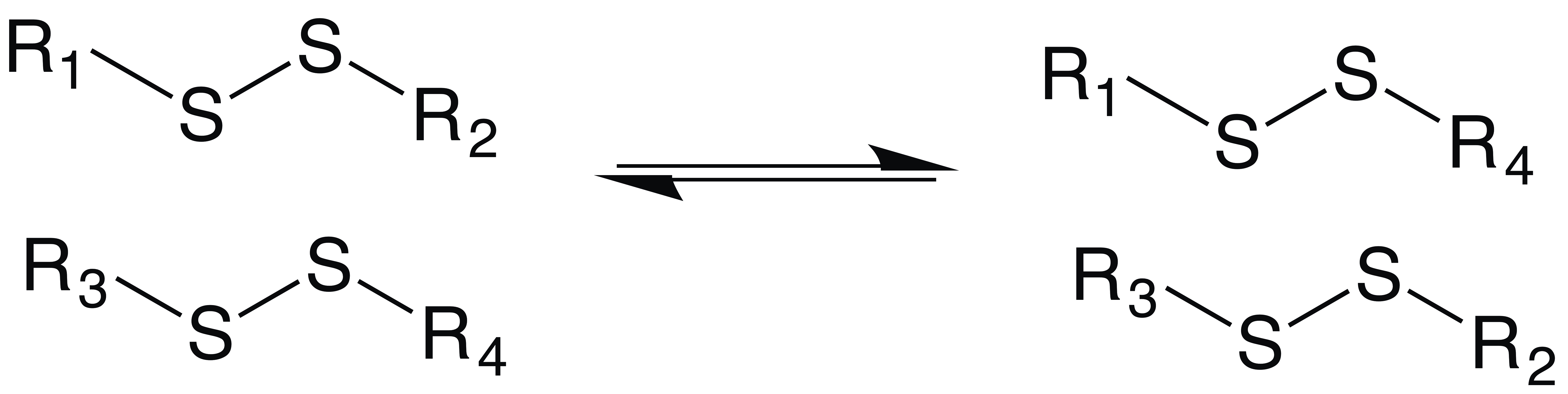
Scheme 8: Disulfide exchange between asymmetric disulfides

==== Boronic acid ====
Boronic acid self-condensation or condensation with diols is a well-documented dynamic covalent reaction. The boronic acid condensation has the characteristic of forming two dynamic bonds with various substrates. This is advantageous when designing systems where high rigidity is desired, such as 3-D cages and COFs.

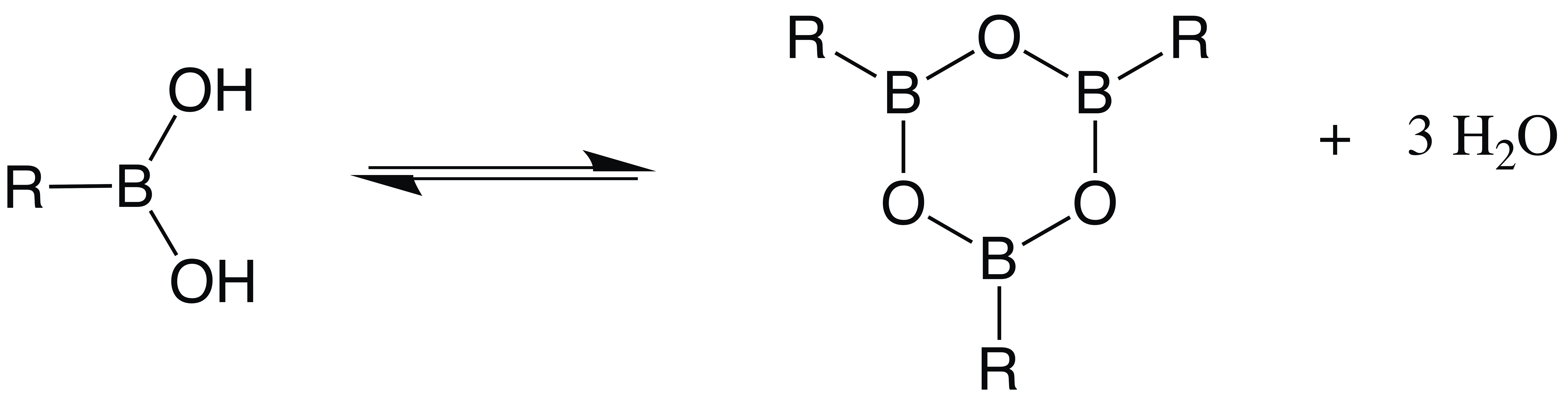
Scheme 9: Boronic acid condensation

== Applications in research ==
Although dynamic covalent chemistry has no practical applications, it has allowed access to a wide variety of supramolecular structures. Using the above reactions to link molecular fragments, higher order materials have been made. These materials include macrocycles, COFs, and molecular knots. The applications of these products have been used in gas storage, catalysis, and biomedical sensing, among others.

=== Dynamic signaling cascades ===
Dynamic covalent reactions have recently been used in Systems chemistry to initiate signaling cascades by reversibly releasing protons. The dynamic nature of the reactions provides a suitable "on-off" switch-like nature to the cascade systems.

=== Macrocycles ===
Many examples exist that demonstrate the utility of DCvC in macrocycle synthesis. This type of chemistry is effective for large macrocycle synthesis because the thermodynamic template effect is well suited to stabilize ring structures. Furthermore, the error-correcting ability inherent to DCvC allows large structures to be made without flaws.

=== Covalent organic frameworks ===
All current methods of covalent organic framework (COF) synthesis use DCvC. Boronic acid dehydration, as demonstrated by Yaghi et al. is the most common type of reaction used. COFs have been used in gas storage, catalysis, . Possible morphologies include infinite covalent 3D frameworks, 2D polymers, or discrete molecular cages.

=== Molecular knots ===
DCvC has been used to make molecules with complex topological properties. In the case of Borromean rings, DCvC is used to synthesize a three ring interlocking system. Thermodynamic templates are used to stabilize interlocking macrocycle growth.

=== Covalent adaptable networks / Vitrimers ===
DCvC is used to construct covalent adaptable networks (CANs) or vitrimers. These are crosslinked polymer networks, whereby the crosslinks contain dynamic covalent bonds. The dynamic covalent bonds enable the crosslinked polymer to be rearranged when enough energy (typically heat) is provided. This enables the manufacturing of dynamic and reprocessable thermoset materials.

== See also ==
- Organic chemistry
- Supramolecular chemistry
- Template effect
- Boronic acids in supramolecular chemistry: Saccharide recognition
- Dynamic combinatorial chemistry
- Thermodynamic control
