= Ludwik Leibler =

Ludwik Leibler, born in 1952 is a Polish-born French physicist. He is Professor of École supérieure de physique et de chimie industrielles de la ville de Paris (ESPCI ParisTech) and member of the French Academy of Sciences and National Academy of Engineering.

Ludwik Leibler received his PhD in 1976 in Theoretical Physics from Warsaw University, and then spent two years as a post-doctoral fellow at the Collège de France in Paris under the direction of Pierre-Gilles de Gennes. He is a researcher in Centre National de Recherche Scientifique (CNRS) which he joined first in Stasbourg then in Paris where he worked on theoretical and experimental aspects of polymer self-assembly and dynamics, interfaces, gels and charged polymers. From 1996 to 2003 he was the founding director of a joint laboratory between CNRS and chemical company Elf Atochem (later Arkema) which regrouped researchers from academia and industry. In 2001 he became professor of Soft Matter and Chemistry at École Supérieure de Physique et Chimie Industrielles in Paris where his research interests include influence of molecular disorder on mesoscopic structure and properties of polymer materials, impact resistance, fracture and adhesion, design of stimuli responsive materials and supramolecular chemistry.

== Awards ==
- 2019 Honorary doctoral degree from the division of the Faculty of Sciences of Ghent University
- 2019 European Polymer Federation (EPF) prize
- 2015 Descartes-Huygens Prize of the Royal Netherlands Academy of Arts and Sciences (KNAW)
- 2015 European Inventor Award 2015
- 2014 member of National Academy of Engineering
- 2014 EPJE Pierre-Gilles De Gennes Lecture Prize
- 2013 CNRS Medal of Innovation
- 2012 Grand Prix, Fondation de la Maison de Chimie
- 2012 Netherlands Polymer Technology Network Award
- 2009 Grand Prix of French Chemical Society, Prix Pierre Süe
- 2009 Grand Prix of Academy of Sciences, Prix IFP
- 2007 American Chemical Society Award in Polymer Chemistry
- 2006 Polymer Physics Prize of American Physical Society
- 2004 Foreign Associate of National Academy of Engineering, Washington DC
- 2004 Distinguished Polymer Scientist Award, IUPAC World Polymer Congress Macromolecules 2004
- 1989 IBM Scientific Prize in Materials Science
- 1989 CNRS Silver Medal
- 1986 French Polymer Society (G.F.P.) Prize
- 1979 Joliot-Curie Fellowship, France
- 1977 Rector of Warsaw University Award for the best Ph.D. thesis
- 1974 Polish Physical Society Award for the best M. Sc. thesis

Dr. Leibler was elected a member of National Academy of Engineering in 2004 for fundamental theoretical insights into the structure, self-assembly, and properties of polymer-based formulations. He is a recipient of the CNRS Silver Medal, France IBM Prize in Material Science, the Polymer Physics prize of the American Physical Society (2006) and the Polymer Chemistry Award of the American Chemical Society (2007). In 2014, he was awarded EPJE Pierre-Gilles De Gennes Lecture Prize. In January 2015, the Royal Netherlands Academy of Arts and Sciences (KNAW) has awarded him the annual Descartes-Huygens Prize. In March 2019, Ludwik Leibler received honorary doctoral degree from the division of the Faculty of Sciences of Ghent University. The 2019 European Polymer Federation (EPF) prize was awarded to Ludwik Leibler “For groundbreaking contributions to the understanding of the phase behavior of block copolymers and for the discovery of new materials based on dynamic bonds like selfhealing rubbers, vitrimers and tissue glues”.
