= Nugent score =

Gram stain scoring system for vaginal swabs to diagnose bacterial vaginosis

- Purpose: diagnose bacterial vaginosis

The Nugent Score is a Gram stain scoring system for vaginal swabs to diagnose bacterial vaginosis (BV). The Nugent score is calculated by assessing for the presence of large Gram-positive rods (Lactobacillus morphotypes; decrease in Lactobacillus scored as 0 to 4), small Gram-variable rods (Gardnerella vaginalis morphotypes; scored as 0 to 4), and curved Gram-variable rods (Mobiluncus spp. morphotypes; scored as 0 to 2). A score of 7 to 10 is consistent with bacterial vaginosis without culture. The Nugent Score is now rarely used by physicians due to the time it takes to read the slides and requires the use of a trained microscopist. Bacterial vaginosis diagnosis is done by evaluating the pH, the presences of Lactobacillus spp. versus a mixed flora consisting of Gardnerella vaginalis, Bacteroides spp, Mobiluncus spp, and Mycoplasma hominis. The Amsel Criteria for bacterial vaginosis includes pH, evaluating the presence of clue cells, white discharge and an odor of amines after mixing with KOH.

== Scoring ==
Prior to the development of Nugent score, assessment of bacterial vaginosis was based on culturing G. vaginalis, examining a gram stain of vaginal discharge and gas chromatography.

A score of 0-10 is generated from combining three other scores. The scores are as follows:

- 0–3 is considered negative for BV
- 4–6 is considered indeterminate for bacterial vaginosis
- 7+ is considered indicative of BV.

At least 10–20 high power (1000× oil immersion) fields are counted and an average determined.

Lactobacillus morphotypes — average per high powered (1000× oil immersion) field. View multiple fields.	Gardnerella / Bacteroides morphotypes — average per high powered (1000× oil immersion) field. View multiple fields.	Curved Gram variable rods — average per high powered (1000× oil immersion) field. View multiple fields (note that this factor is less important — scores of only 0–2 are possible)
Score 0 for >30; Score 1 for 5–30; Score 2 for 1-4; Score 3 for < 1 (this is an average, so results can be >0, yet <1); Score 4 for 0	Score 0 for 0; Score 1 for <1 (this is an average, so results can be >0, yet <1); Score 2 for 1–4; Score 3 for 5–30; Score 4 for > 30	Score 0 for 0; Score 1 for 1-4; Score 2 for >= 5

The scoring system was proposed by Robert P Nugent in 1991. In the study, vaginal swabs were obtained from pregnant women.
