= High vaginal swab =

Medical procedure

High vaginal swab (swab test)
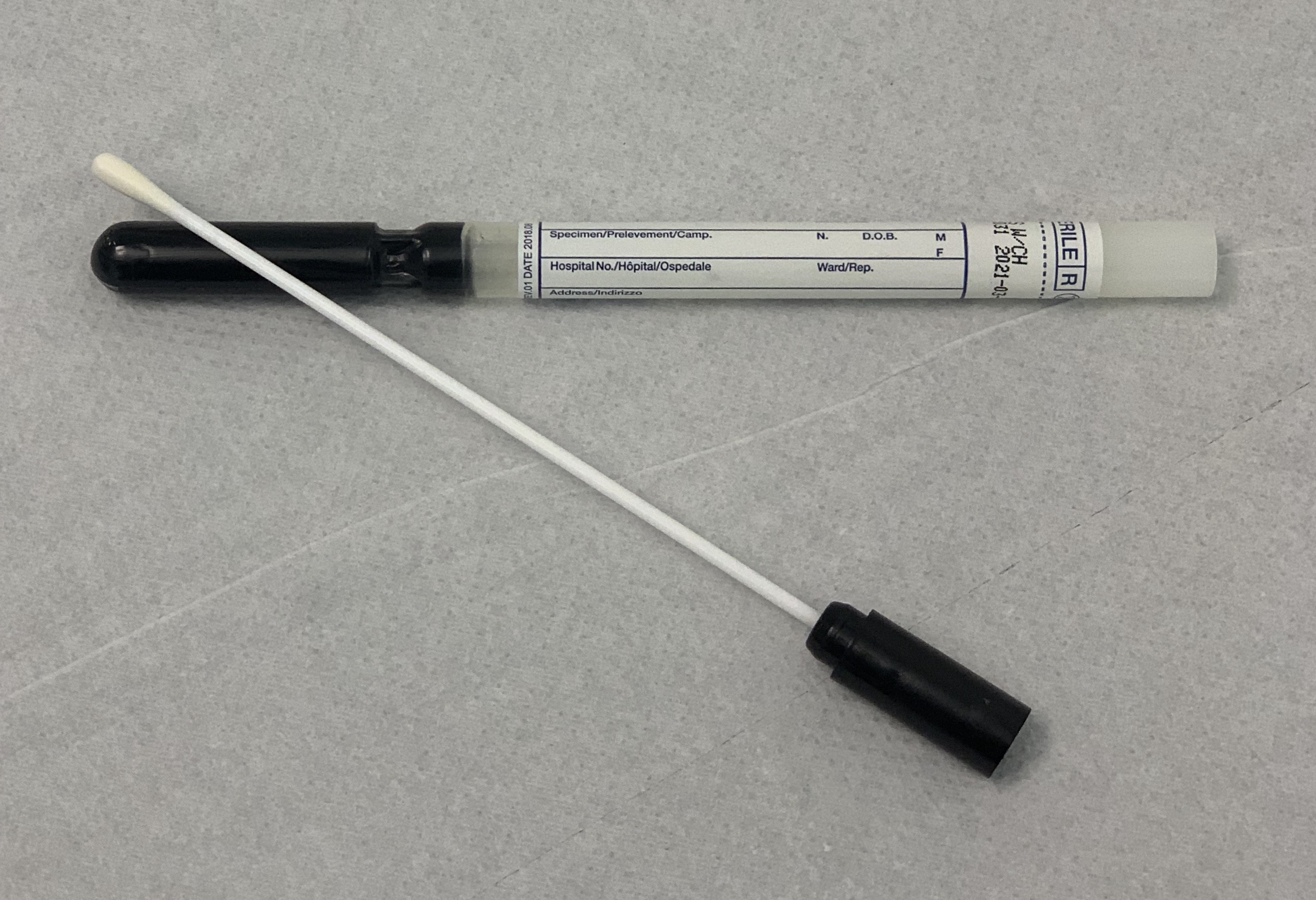
- Swab used for performing a HVS
- Purpose: Test vaginal discharge
- Test of: Vaginal thrush, bacterial vaginosis, trichomonas vaginalis

A high vaginal swab (HVS) is a medical procedure performed in obstetrics and gynaecology to test vaginal discharge for the presence of vaginal thrush, bacterial vaginosis and trichomonas vaginalis.

It is carried out in clean conditions, by a healthcare professional who uses a speculum to look at the cervix and vagina. After inserting the swab to the top of the vagina, it is rotated around to obtain a sample of the discharge and subsequently, the speculum is removed and the sample sent for microscopy, culture and sensitivity.

== Uses ==
A high vaginal swab is a medical procedure generally to test vaginal discharge for the presence of vaginal thrush, bacterial vaginosis and trichomonas vaginalis. It may be performed when there is vaginal bleeding alone and can be done at the same time as a smear test.

== Technique ==
The procedure is carried out with good light and in clean conditions by a healthcare professional. After lubricating the speculum in warm water, it is inserted into the vagina to see the vagina and cervix, whilst also protecting the swab from being contaminated by organisms on the vulva. After inserting the swab to the top of the vagina, it is rotated to obtain a sample of the discharge and subsequently, the speculum is removed and the sample sent for microscopy, culture and sensitivity, in charcoal-based transport medium. If the sample cannot be sent to the laboratory immediately, it may be stored in a fridge.

It cannot be used to look for chlamydia or gonorrhoea.

== Evaluation ==
Although the presence of laboratory facilities is ideal, in places where resources are limited, a HVS can be performed and evaluated at the bedside. Using HVS, candida and trichomonas may be diagnosed with a wet mount microscopy.
