= Vaginitis =

- Other names: Vulvovaginitis, vaginal infection, vaginal inflammation
- Pronunciation: /vædʒɪˈnaɪtɪs/
- Specialty: Gynecology
- Symptoms: Itching, burning, pain, discharge, bad smell
- Causes: Infections (bacterial vaginosis, vaginal yeast infection, trichomoniasis), allergic reactions, low estrogen
- Diagnostic method: Based on examination, measuring the pH, culturing the discharge
- Differential diagnosis: Inflammation of the cervix, pelvic inflammatory disease, cancer, foreign bodies
- Treatment: Based on the cause
- Frequency: ~33% of women (at some point)

Vaginitis, also known as vulvovaginitis, is inflammation of the vagina and vulva. Symptoms may include itching, burning, pain, discharge, and a bad smell. Certain types of vaginitis may result in complications during pregnancy.

The three main causes are infections, specifically bacterial vaginosis, vaginal yeast infection, and trichomoniasis. Other causes include allergies to substances such as spermicides or soaps or as a result of low estrogen levels during breast-feeding or after menopause. More than one cause may exist at a time. The common causes vary by age. Prepubescent girls are often at risk for development of vulvovaginitis because of low amounts of estrogen and an underdeveloped labia minora.

Diagnosis generally include examination, measuring the pH, and culturing the discharge. Other causes of symptoms such as inflammation of the cervix, pelvic inflammatory disease, cancer, foreign bodies, and skin conditions should be ruled out.

Treatment depends on the underlying cause. Infections should be treated. Sitz baths may help with symptoms. Soaps and feminine hygiene products such as sprays should not be used. About a third of women have vaginitis at some point in time. Women of reproductive age are most often affected.

== Signs and symptoms ==
A woman may have vaginal irritation, itching, or burning or may notice a foul-smelling or abnormal discharge that could appear green or yellow.

The following signs or symptoms may indicate the presence of infection:

- Irritation or itching of the genital area
- inflammation (irritation, redness, and swelling caused by the presence of extra immune cells) of the labia majora, labia minora, or perineal area
- vaginal discharge
- foul vaginal odor
- pain/irritation with sexual intercourse

=== Complications ===
Vaginal infections left untreated can lead to further complications, especially for the pregnant woman. For bacterial vaginosis, these include "premature delivery, postpartum infections, clinically apparent and subclinical pelvic inflammatory disease, [as well as] postsurgical complications (after abortion, hysterectomy, caesarian section), increased vulnerability to HIV infection and, possibly, infertility". Studies have also linked trichomoniasis with increased likelihood of acquiring HIV; theories include that "vaginitis increases the number of immune cells at the site of infection, and HIV then infects those immune cells." Other theories suggest that trichomoniasis increases the amount of HIV genital shedding, thereby increasing the risk of transmission to sexual partners. While the exact association between trichomoniasis infection and HIV genital shedding has not been consistently demonstrated, "there is good evidence that TV treatment reduces HIV genital shedding. Five studies were reported in the literature and, of these, four found a decrease in HIV genital shedding after TV treatment."

Further, there are complications which lead to daily discomfort such as:

- persistent discomfort
- superficial skin infection (from scratching)
- complications of the causative condition (such as gonorrhea and candida infection)

== Causes ==
=== Infection ===
Vaginitis is often caused by an infection or the disruption of the healthy vaginal flora. The vaginal flora consists of those organisms which generally do not cause symptoms and is dominated mainly by Lactobacillus species. Disruption of the normal flora can cause a vaginal yeast infection. Vaginal yeast infection can affect women of all ages and is very common. The yeast Candida albicans is the most common cause of vaginitis. Specific forms of vaginal inflammation include the following types:

Infectious vaginitis accounts for 90% of all cases in reproductive age women:

- Candidiasis: vaginitis caused by proliferation of Candida albicans, Candida tropicalis, Candida krusei
- Bacterial vaginosis: vaginitis caused by increased growth of Gardnerella (a bacterium).
- Aerobic vaginitis

Other less common infections are caused by gonorrhea, chlamydia, Mycoplasma, herpes, Campylobacter, improper hygiene, and some parasites, notably Trichomonas vaginalis. Rare cases of amebic vaginitis have been reported, primarily in tropical, developing countries. Women who have diabetes develop infectious vaginitis more often than women who do not.

Further, either a change in pH balance or introduction of foreign bacteria in the vagina can lead to infectious vaginitis. Physical factors that have been claimed to contribute to the development of infections include the following: constantly wet vulva due to tight clothing, chemicals coming in contact with the vagina via scented tampons, antibiotics, birth control pills, or a diet favoring refined sugar and yeast.

=== Hormonal ===
Hormonal vaginitis includes atrophic vaginitis usually found in postmenopausal women.

=== Irritation/allergy ===
Irritant vaginitis can be caused by allergies or reactions to vaginal sprays, douches, spermicides, soaps, detergents, or fabric softeners. It can also be caused by hot tubs, abrasion, tissue, tampons, or topical medications.

Foreign body vaginitis (most common foreign bodies are retained tampons or condoms) may cause extremely malodorous vaginal discharges. Treatment consists of removal, for which ring forceps may be useful. Further treatment is generally not necessary.

== Diagnosis ==
Diagnosis is typically suspected based on a women's symptoms. Diagnosis is made with microscopy (mostly by vaginal wet mount) and culture of the discharge after a careful history and physical examination have been completed. The color, consistency, acidity, and other characteristics of the discharge may be predictive of the causative agent. Determining the agent is especially important because women may have more than one infection, or have symptoms that overlap those of another infection, which dictates different treatment processes to cure the infection. For example, women often self-diagnose for yeast infections but due to the 89% misdiagnosis rate, self-diagnoses of vaginal infections are highly discouraged.

Another type of vaginitis, called desquamative inflammatory vaginitis (DIV) also exists. The cause behind this type is still poorly understood. DIV corresponds to the severe forms of aerobic vaginitis. About 5 to 10% of women are affected by aerobic vaginitis.

The International Statistical Classification of Diseases and Related Health Problems codes for the several causes of vaginitis are:

Condition	Description	pH
Candida vaginitis (B37.3)	Commonly referred to as a yeast infection, Candidiasis is a fungal infection that usually causes a watery, white, cottage cheese-like vaginal discharges. The discharge is irritating to the vagina and the surrounding skin.	low (4.0–4.5)
Atrophic vaginitis (N95.2)	Usually causes scant vaginal discharge with no odor, dry vagina and painful intercourse. These symptoms are usually due to decreased hormones usually occurring during and after menopause. Current term is Genitourinary syndrome of menopause.	alkaline
Bacterial vaginitis (B96.3).	Gardnerella usually causes a discharge with a fish-like odor. It is associated with itching and irritation, but not pain during intercourse.	elevated
Trichomonas vaginalis (A59.0)	Can cause a profuse discharge with a fish-like odor, pain upon urination, painful intercourse, and inflammation of the external genitals.	elevated (5.0–6.0)
Aerobic vaginitis	Burning, stinging and dyspareunia. Non-malodorous yellowish discharge. Symptoms can last for several years. The condition can also be asymptomatic. Thinned reddish vaginal mucosa, sometimes with erosions or ulcerations and abundant yellowish discharge	Increased

== Prevention ==
Prevention of candidiasis, the most common type of vaginitis, includes using loose cotton underwear. The vaginal area should be washed with water. Perfumed soaps, shower gels, and vaginal deodorants should be avoided. Douching is not recommended. The practice upsets the normal balance of yeast in the vagina and does more harm than good.

Prevention of bacterial vaginosis includes healthy diets and behaviors as well as minimizing stress as all these factors can affect the pH balance of the vagina.

Prevention of trichomoniasis revolves around avoiding other people's wet towels and hot tubs, and safe-sex procedures, such as condom use.

Some women consume good bacteria in food with live culture, such as yogurt, sauerkraut and kimchi, or in probiotic supplements either to try to prevent candidiasis, or to reduce the likelihood of developing bacterial vaginitis following antibiotic treatment. There is no firm evidence to suggest that eating live yogurt or taking probiotic supplements will prevent candidiasis.

Studies have suggested a possible clinical role for the use of standardized oral or vaginal probiotics in the treatment of bacterial vaginosis, either in addition to or in place of the typical antibiotic regimens. However, recent articles question their efficacy in preventing recurrence compared with other means, or conclude that there is insufficient evidence for or against recommending probiotics for the treatment of bacterial vaginosis.

== Treatment ==
The cause of the infection determines the appropriate treatment. It may include oral or topical antibiotics and/or antifungal creams, antibacterial creams, or similar medications. A cream containing cortisone may also be used to relieve some of the irritation. If an allergic reaction is involved, an antihistamine may also be prescribed. For women who have irritation and inflammation caused by low levels of estrogen (postmenopausal), a topical estrogen cream might be prescribed.

The following are typical treatments for trichomoniasis, bacterial vaginosis, and yeast infections:

- Trichomoniasis: Oral treatment with either metronidazole or tinidazole. "Sexual partner(s) should be treated simultaneously. Patients should be advised to avoid sexual intercourse for at least 1 week and until they and their partner(s) have completed treatment and follow-up."
- Bacterial vaginosis: The most commonly used antibiotics are metronidazole, available in both pill and gel form, and clindamycin available in both pill and cream form.
- Yeast infections: Local azole, in the form of ovula and cream. All agents appear to be equally effective. These anti-fungal medications, which are available in over the counter form, are generally used to treat yeast infections. Treatment may last anywhere between one, three, or seven days.

=== Aerobic vaginitis ===
Treatment can include topical steroids to diminish the inflammation. Antibiotics to diminish the proportion of aerobic bacteria is still a matter of debate. The use of local antibiotics, preferably local non-absorbed and broad spectrum, covering enteric gram-positive and gram-negative aerobes, can be an option. In some cases, systemic antibiotics can be helpful, such as amoxicillin/clavulanate or moxifloxacin. Vaginal rinsing with povidone iodine can provide relief of symptoms but does not provide long-term reduction of bacterial loads. Dequalinium chloride can also be an option for treatment.

=== Mixed infectious vaginitis ===
Mixed infectious vaginitis is a condition caused by multiple pathogens, leading to significant alterations in the vaginal environment, including a decrease in lactic acid bacteria, an increase in vaginal pH, and a reduction in local defenses. The term "mixed" refers to the involvement of multiple pathogens in causing the condition. The female vagina hosts a diverse array of over 50 different microorganisms that interact and coexist in a complex microecological environment. When the balance among these microorganisms is disrupted, it can lead to mixed infectious vaginitis, with the specific pathogens involved varying based on individual cases and environmental factors. This condition often results in distressing symptoms like vulvar itching, burning pain, and urethral irritation, and can be complicated by increasing drug resistance and recurrence rates, particularly in patients with ineffective treatment, long-term contraceptive use, or compromised sexual hygiene. Mixed infectious vaginitis is a condition characterized by the simultaneous infection of two or more types of pathogens, which may include Chlamydia, Mycoplasma, anaerobic bacteria, and aerobic bacteria. Additionally, this mixed infection can also involve yeast, further contributing to the complexity of the condition.

An effective treatment option for mixed infectious vaginitis is a combination of clotrimazole and metronidazole.

== In children ==
Vulvovaginitis in children may be "nonspecific", or caused by irritation with no known infectious cause, or infectious, caused by a pathogenic organism. Nonspecific vulvovaginitis may be triggered by fecal contamination, sexual abuse, chronic diseases, foreign bodies, nonestrogenized epithelium, chemical irritants, eczema, seborrhea, or immunodeficiency. It is treated with topical steroids; antibiotics may be given in cases where itching has resulted in a secondary infection.

Infectious vulvovaginitis can be caused by group A beta-hemolytic Streptococcus (7-20% of cases), Haemophilus influenzae, Streptococcus pneumoniae, Staphylococcus aureus, Shigella, Yersinia, or common STI organisms (Neisseria gonorrhoeae, Chlamydia trachomatis, Trichomonas vaginalis, herpes simplex virus, and human papillomavirus). Symptoms and treatment of infectious vulvovaginitis vary depending on the organism causing it. Shigella infections of the reproductive tract usually coexist with infectious of the gastrointestinal tract and cause mucous, purulent discharge. They are treated with trimethoprim-sulfamethoxazole. Streptococcus infections cause similar symptoms to nonspecific vulvovaginitis and are treated with amoxicillin. STI-associated vulvovaginitis may be caused by sexual abuse or vertical transmission, and are treated and diagnosed like adult infections.

== See also ==
- List of bacterial vaginosis microbiota and diseases of the urinary system
- Renal tuberculosis
