= KOH test =

Test to differentiate between skin fungi

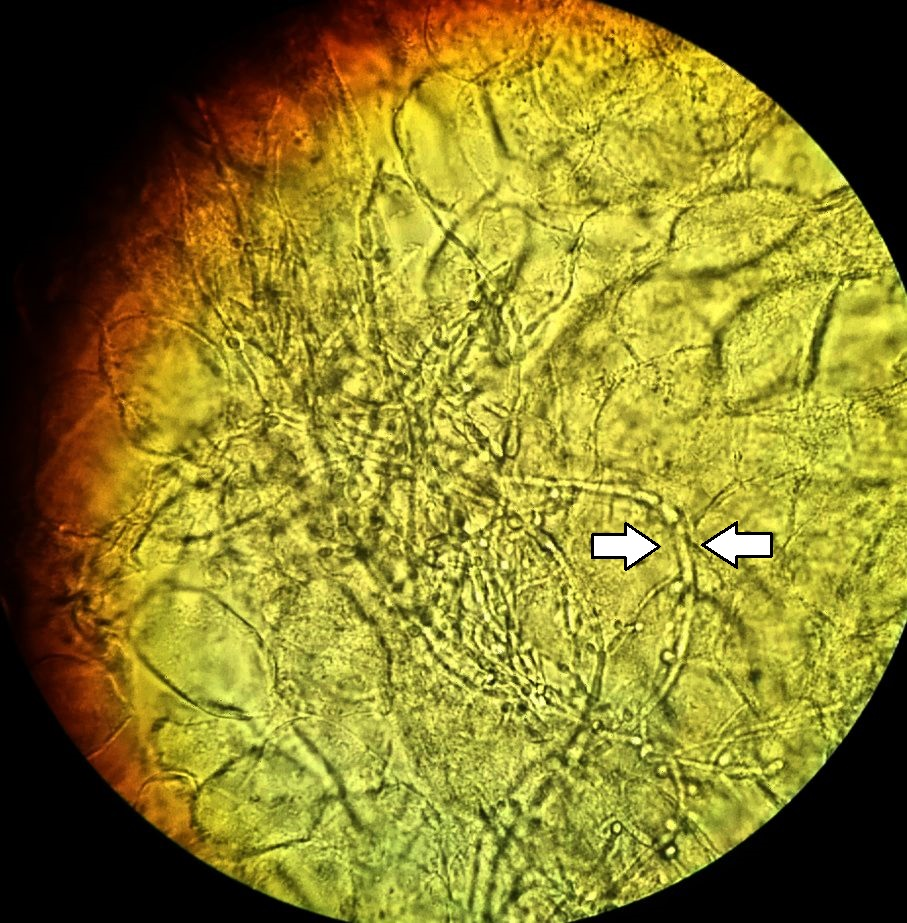
KOH test on a vaginal wet mount, showing slings of pseudohyphae of Candida albicans surrounded by round vaginal epithelial cells, conferring a diagnosis of candidal vulvovaginitis.

The KOH test, also known as a potassium hydroxide preparation or KOH prep, is a quick, inexpensive fungal test to differentiate dermatophytes and Candida albicans symptoms from other skin disorders like psoriasis and eczema.

Dermatophytes are a type of fungus that invades the top layer of the skin, hair, or nails. There are three genera of fungi commonly implicated: Trichophyton (found in skin, nail, and hair infections), Epidermophyton (skin and nail infections), and Microsporum (skin and hair infections). Dermatophytes produce an infection commonly known as ringworm or tinea. It can appear as "jock itch" in the groin or inner thighs (tinea cruris); on the scalp and hair (tinea capitis) resulting in brittle hair shafts that fall out easily. Tinea unguium affects the nails and athlete's foot (tinea pedis) affects the feet. Tinea versicolor refers to a fungal infection of the skin caused by Malassezia furfur. It appears anywhere on the skin and produces red or gray, scaly patches of itchy skin. Deeper infections may be discoloured, ulcerative and purulent.

A Candida yeast infection can also be identified by a KOH test by taking scrapings from the mouth (oral thrush), vagina (vaginitis) and skin (candidiasis). There are over 40 different fungus species known to cause disease in humans, of which Candida albicans is the most common and most frequently tested for.

== Procedure ==
The KOH test for fungus is conducted on an outpatient basis and patients do not need to prepare in advance. Results are usually available while the patient waits or the next day if sent to a clinical laboratory. The KOH test procedure may be performed by a physician, nurse practitioner, physician associate, medical assistant, nurse, midwife or medical laboratory technician. If fungal cultures are required, the test is performed by a technologist who specializes in microbiology.

1. Collection: Skin, nail, or hair samples are collected from the infected area on the patient. For skin samples, a scalpel or edge of a glass slide is used to gently scrape skin scales from the infected area. For hair samples, a forceps is used to remove hair shafts and follicles from the infected site. If the test is being sent to a laboratory, the scrapings are placed in a sterile covered container.
2. The scrapings are placed directly onto a microscope slide and are covered with 10% or 20% potassium hydroxide.
3. The slide is left to stand until clear, normally between five and fifteen minutes, in order to dissolve skin cells, hair, and debris.
4. To enhance clearing dimethyl sulfoxide can be added to the slide. To make the fungi easier to see lactophenol cotton blue stain can be added.
5. The slide is gently heated to speed up the action of the KOH.
6. Adding calcofluor-white stain to the slide will cause the fungi to become fluorescent, making them easier to identify under a fluorescence microscope.
7. Place the slide under a microscope to read.

== Evaluation ==
Dermatophytes are easily recognized under the microscope by their long branch-like tubular structures called hyphae. Fungi causing ringworm infections produce septate (segmented) hyphae. Some show the presence of spores formed directly from the hyphae (arthroconidia). Under the microscope Tinea versicolor is recognized by curved hyphae and round yeast forms that give it a spaghetti-and-meatball appearance. Yeast cells appear round or oval and budding forms may be seen. The KOH prep cannot identify the specific organism; the specimen can be submitted for fungal culture to identify the organism.

A normal, or negative, KOH test shows no fungi (no dermatophytes or yeast). Dermatophytes or yeast seen on a KOH test indicate the person has a fungal infection. Follow-up tests are usually unnecessary.

The skin may be sore after the test because of the tissue being scraped off the top of the surface of the skin.
