= Vly =

Vly may refer to:

- A short form for Valley
- An alternate spelling for Vlaie, a Dutch name for a swamp
- Vly Mountain, a mountain located in the town of Halcott, New York, United States in Greene County

VLY may refer to:

- IATA code for Anglesey Airport (civilian) / RAF Valley (military) on Anglesey, Wales
- Vaginolysin, a bacterial toxin
- A brand identity of Volleyball Ireland
