= Actino-ugpB RNA motif =

Actino-ugpB
- Consensus secondary structure and sequence conservation of Actino-ugpB RNA

Identifiers
- Symbol: Actino-ugpB
- Rfam: RF02927

Other data
- RNA type: Gene; sRNA
- SO: SO:0001263
- PDB structures: PDBe

The Actino-ugpB RNA motif is a conserved RNA structure that was discovered by bioinformatics. Actino-ugpB motifs are found in strains of the species Gardnerella vaginalis, within the phylum Actinomycetota.

It is ambiguous whether Actino-ugpB RNAs function as cis-regulatory elements or whether they operate in trans. Many of the RNAs are upstream of the gene 'ugpB', which encodes a protein putatively involved in sugar transport. However, several of the RNAs are not located upstream of a protein-coding gene. Structurally, the motif consists of two hairpins with conserved nucleotides located in the stems and outside of the hairpins, but not in their terminal loops.
