= Hippurate hydrolase =

Class of enzymes

Identifiers
- EC no.: 3.5.1.32
- CAS no.: 37278-43-6

Databases
- BRENDA: enzyme data
- ExPASy: NiceZyme view
- KEGG: enzyme entry
- MetaCyc: metabolic pathway
- Rhea: reactions
- PDB structures: RCSB PDB PDBe PDBsum
- Gene Ontology: AmiGO / QuickGO
Search
- PMC: articles
- PubMed: articles
- NCBI: proteins

Hippurate hydrolase (EC 3.5.1.32) is an enzyme that catalyzes the chemical reaction

hippuric acid
H_{2}O
benzoic acid
+
glycine

The enzyme characterised from Bacillus species and Pseudomonas putida hydrolyses hippuric acid to benzoic acid and glycine. The enzyme contains zinc as Zn^{2+}.

A test for hippurate hydrolysis has been used to identify pathogens such as Gardnerella vaginalis, Campylobacter jejuni, Listeria monocytogenes and group B streptococci which produce the enzyme.

This enzyme is a hydrolase, one acting on carbon-nitrogen bonds other than peptide bonds, specifically in linear amides. The systematic name of this enzyme class is N-benzoylamino-acid amidohydrolase. It is also called N-Benzoylglycine amidohydrolase.
