= Vaginolysin =

Bacterium-produced toxin

Vaginolysin (VLY) is a toxin produced by Gardnerella vaginalis, a bacterium commonly associated with bacterial vaginosis. VLY is a member of the cholesterol-dependent cytolysin family, characterized by their ability to form pores in cholesterol rich membranes. The most closely related protein is intermedilysin, which is produced by Streptococcus intermedius.

VLY exhibits cytolytic activity against human erythrocytes, causing lysis of red blood cells. This process releases iron, an essential nutrient for microbial pathogens. In vitro studies have also demonstrated VLY induces membrane blebbing in human vaginal and cervical cells, suggesting its role in epithelial cell damage.

The cytolytic activities of VLY are hypothesized to contribute to the virulence of Neisseria gonorrhoeae, potentially by facilitating the bacterium's access to intracellular metabolites and aiding in its evasion of host immune responses.

== See also ==
- Cholesterol-dependent cytolysin
