= Vaginal wet mount =

Gynecologic test

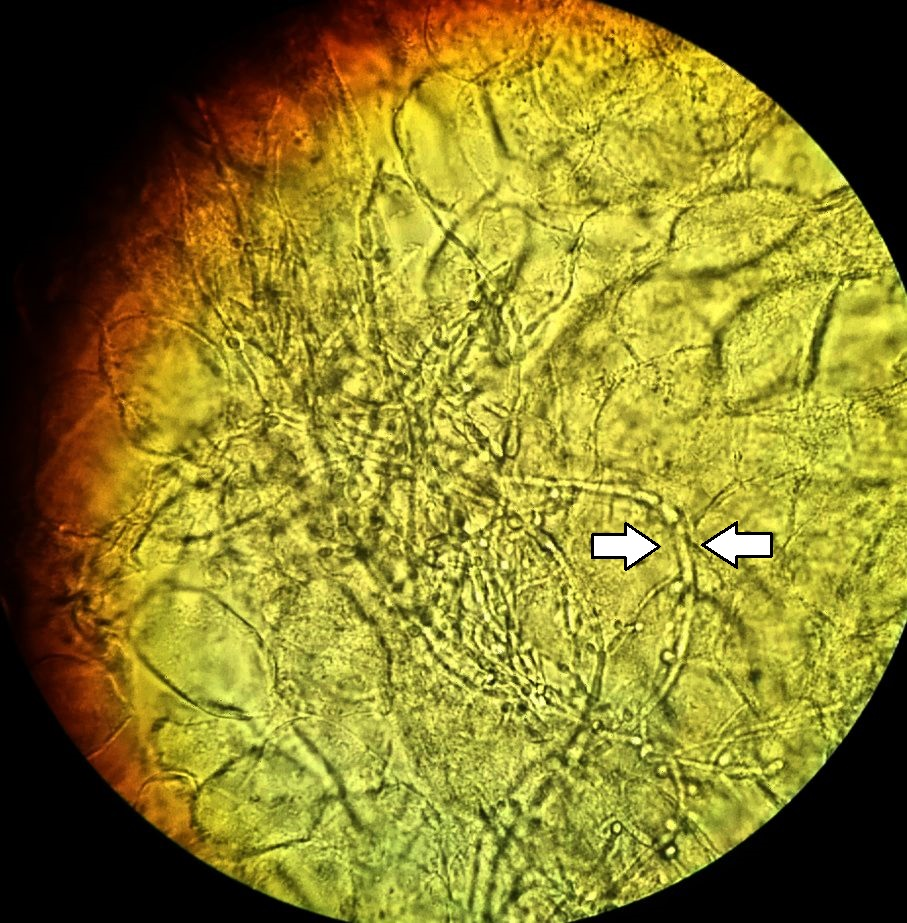
Vaginal wet mount showing slings of pseudohyphae of Candida albicans surrounded by round vaginal epithelial cells, conferring a diagnosis of candidal vulvovaginitis.

A vaginal wet mount (or vaginal smear or wet prep) is a gynecologic test wherein a sample of vaginal discharge is observed by wet mount microscopy by placing the specimen on a glass slide and mixing with a salt solution. It is used to find the cause of vaginitis and vulvitis.

== Applications ==
Vaginal wet mounts are used in case of vaginitis symptoms such as vaginal itching, burning, rash, odor, or discharge. It may assist in suspicion of vaginal yeast infection, trichomoniasis and bacterial vaginosis.

Infections such as chlamydia, genital warts, syphilis, herpes simplex, and gonorrhea can also affect the vagina, but these diseases are found by doing other tests.

It may also be used in a rape investigation to detect presence of semen.

== Method ==
Vaginal wet mounts are not done during the menstrual period, because menstrual blood on the slide can confound the results. Vaginal irrigation, tampon use or sex (potentially disrupting the vaginal pH) should be avoided for 24 hours before the test. Vaginal medicines (such as a nonprescription vaginal yeast medicine) should not be used during the 2 to 3 days before the test.

The sampling is done with the patient in lithotomy position. A speculum is used to facilitate use of a swab or spatula to sample fluid inside the vagina. The sampling procedure may cause some discomfort and minor bleeding, but otherwise there are no associated risks. The sample is then smeared upon a microscope slide and is observed by wet mount microscopy by placing the specimen on a glass slide and mixing with a salt solution.

== Interpretation ==
Normally, no yeast or trichomonas are found on the slide. White blood cells and clue cells are normally absent or very low in number.

Symptoms of infections able to be diagnosed by wet mount:

- A vaginal yeast infection often causes a white, lumpy discharge that looks like cottage cheese.

- diagnosis is made if pseudohyphae or yeast buds are present (these are visible only 50% of the time)

- Trichomoniasis causes a vaginal discharge that is yellow-green, foamy, and bad-smelling.

- Diagnosis is made if mobile trichomonads are visible on the slide

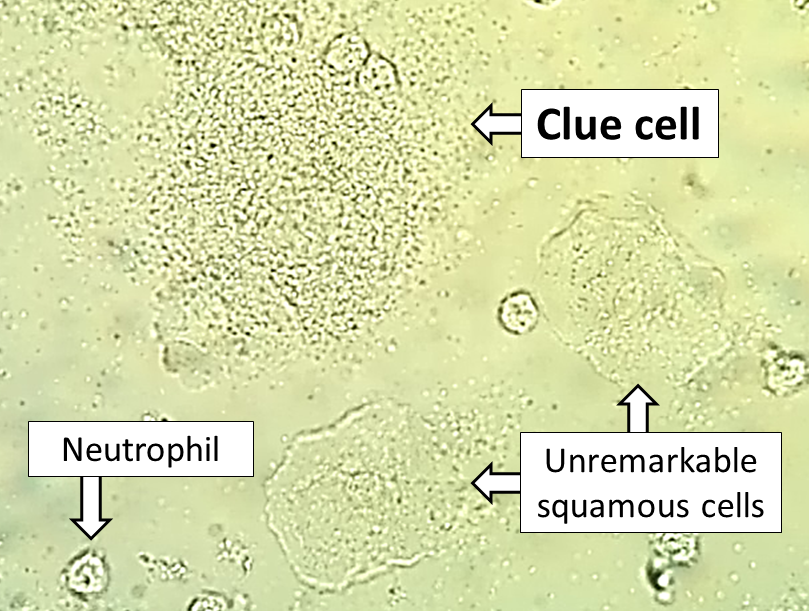
A vaginal wet mount with a clue cell, indicating bacterial vaginosis.

- Bacterial vaginosis generally produces a vaginal discharge that is thin and milky with a fishy odor.

- Diagnosis is made using Amsel Criteria - three of the four following criteria must be met:

- >20% of the epithelial cells are clue cells (the single most reliable predictor)
- Discharge is thin and homogeneous
- Sample smells fishy when mixed with potassium hydroxide ("whiff test")
- Vaginal pH is >4.5

Furthermore, presence of white blood cells is a general sign of infection.

== Concomitant vaginal discharge tests ==
A vaginal discharge sample wet mount is often also used for the following additional tests:

- KOH slide. A sample of the vaginal discharge is placed on a slide and mixed with a solution of potassium hydroxide (KOH). The KOH kills bacteria and cells from the vagina, leaving only yeast for easier detection of a yeast infection. Several drops of a potassium hydroxide (KOH) solution may also be added to a sample of the vaginal discharge to test for any resultant strong fishy odor from the mix, which would indicate bacterial vaginosis. The latter procedure is called a Whiff test.
- Vaginal pH test. The normal vaginal pH is 3.8 to 4.5. Bacterial vaginosis, trichomoniasis, and atrophic vaginitis often cause a vaginal pH higher than 4.5.

If indicated, the sample can also be used for:

- Detecting atrophic vaginitis by additional staining.
- Vaginal culture, to see if bacteria or yeast will grow.

== See also ==
- Pap smear
