= Clue cell =

Epithelial cell of the human vagina that is covered with bacteria

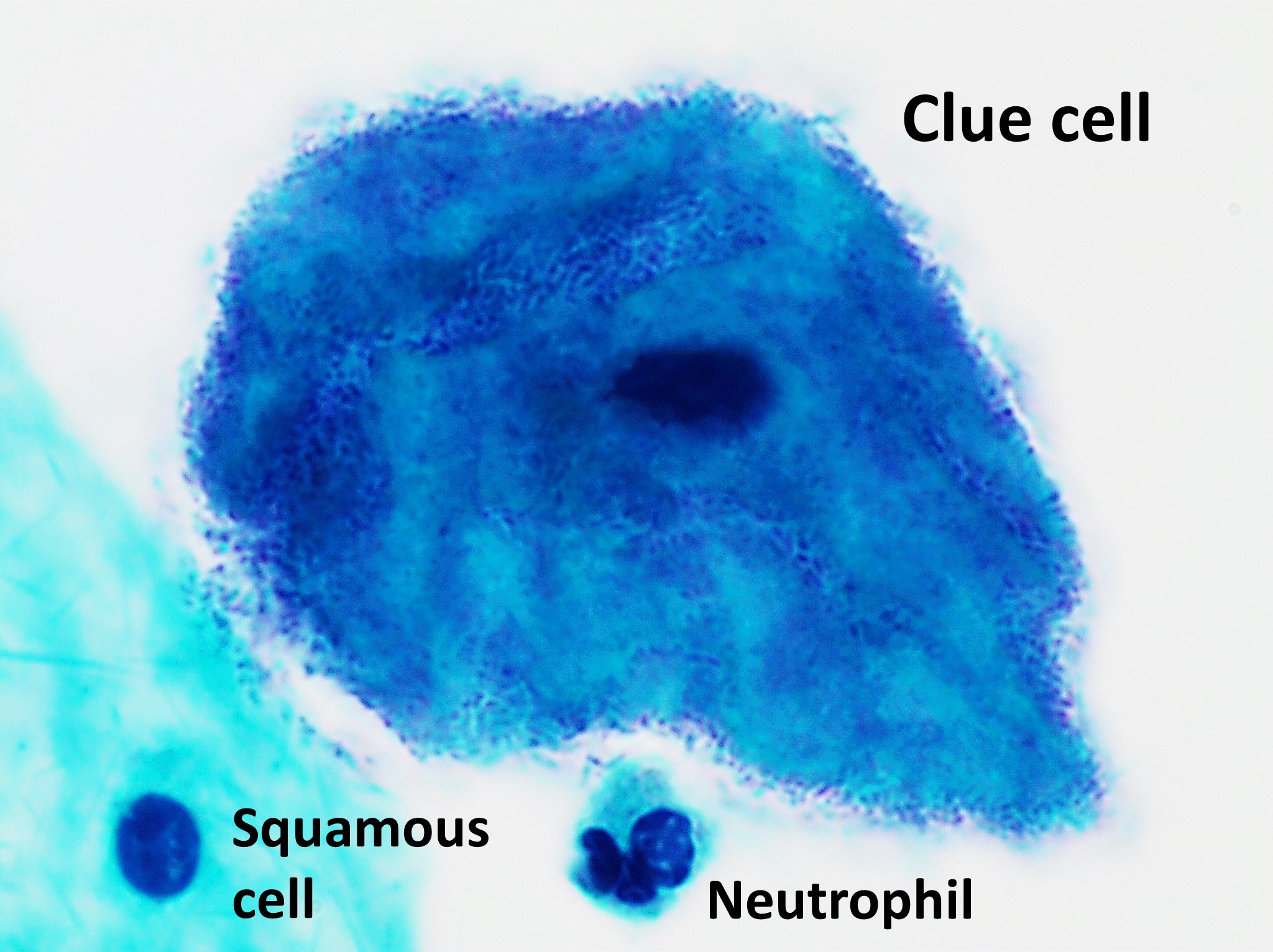
Micrograph of a clue cell (center), covered in bacteria, as compared to an unremarkable squamous cell at bottom left, and a neutrophil at bottom center. Pap stain

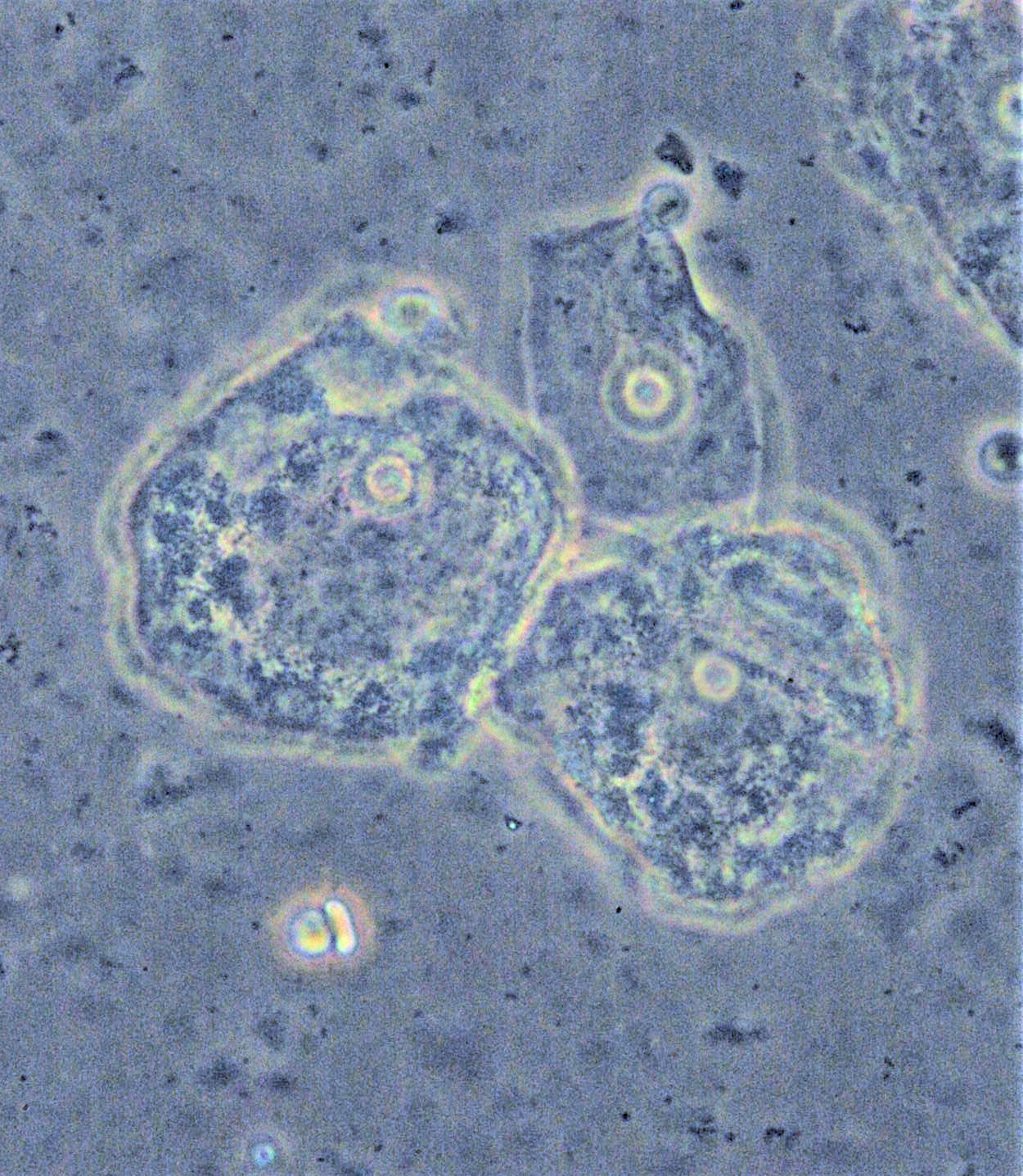
Phase contrast microscopy of clue cells in a vaginal swab

Clue cells are epithelial cells of the vagina that get their distinctive stippled appearance by being covered with bacteria. The etymology behind the term "clue" cell derives from the original research article from Gardner and Dukes describing the characteristic cells. The name was chosen for its brevity in describing the sine qua non of bacterial vaginosis.

They are a medical sign of bacterial vaginosis, particularly that caused by Gardnerella vaginalis, a group of Gram-variable bacteria. This bacterial infection is characterized by thin gray vaginal discharge, and an increase in vaginal pH from around 4.5 to over 5.5.

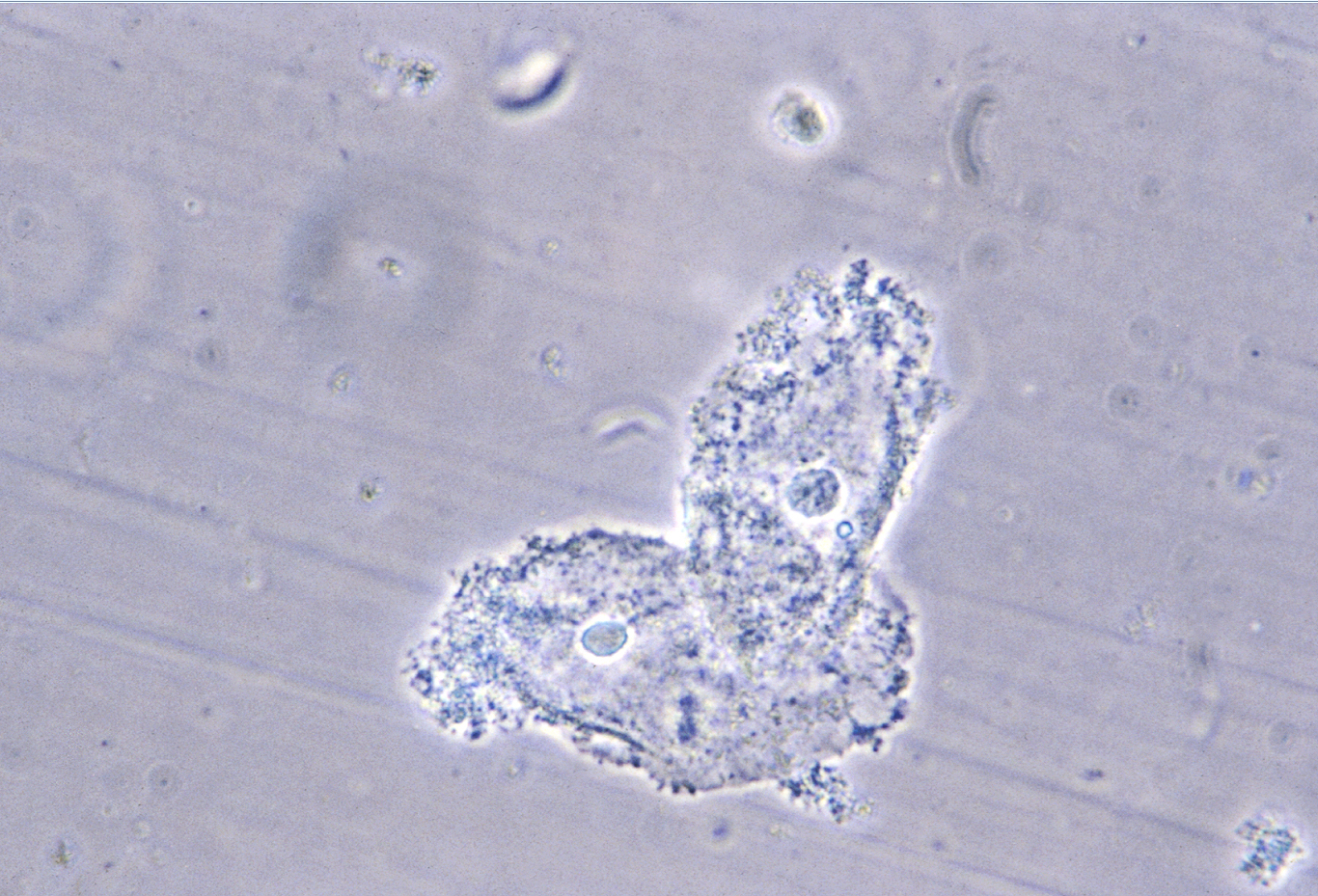
Bacteria obscuring the surfaces of vaginal epithelial cells, giving them a stippled appearance
