= Vaginal yeast infection =

- Other names: Candidal vulvovaginitis, vaginal thrush
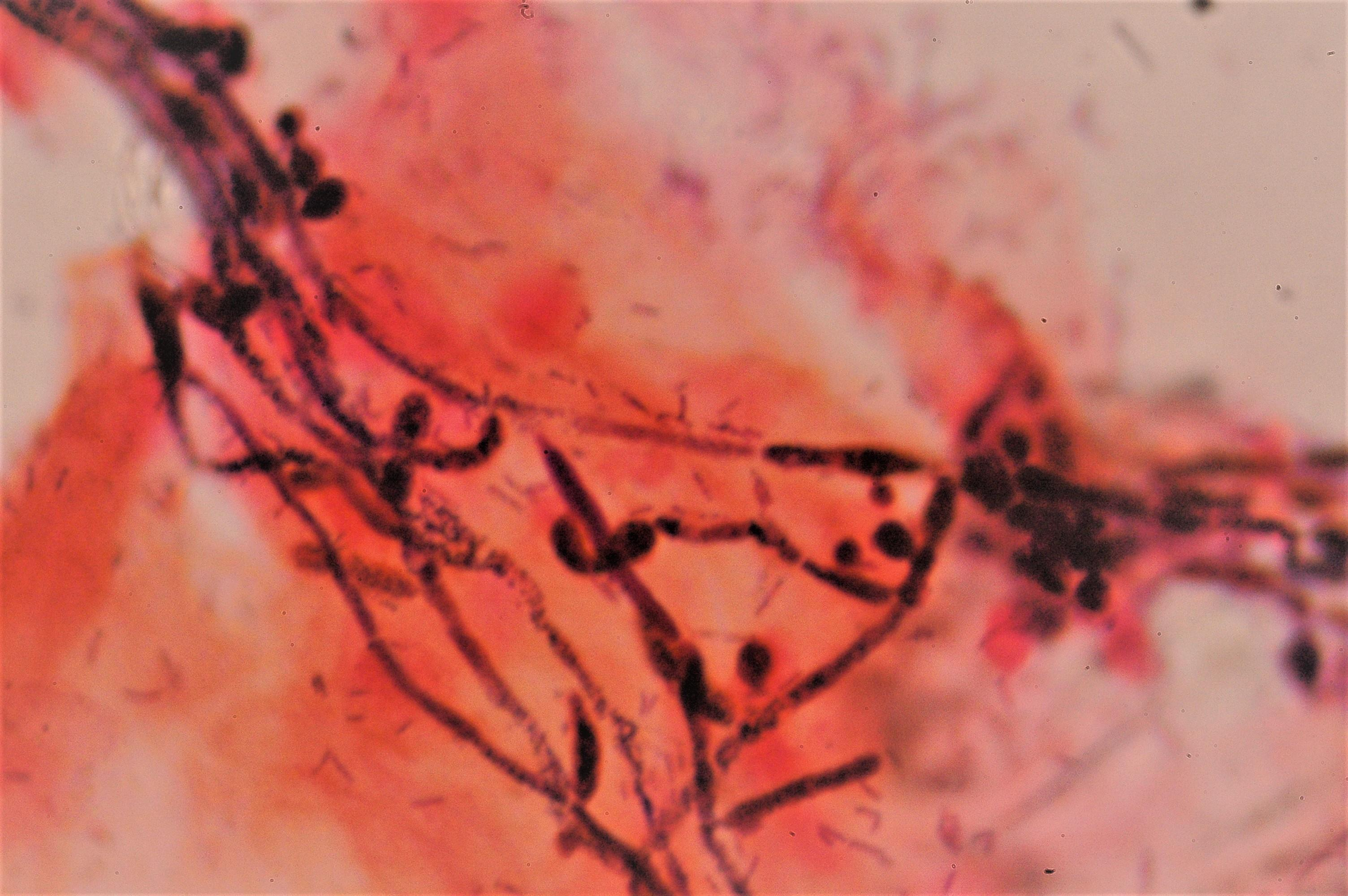
- Gram stain showing the spores and pseudohyphae of Candida albicans surrounded by round vaginal skin cells, in a case of candidal vulvovaginitis
- Specialty: Gynaecology
- Symptoms: Vaginal itching, burning with urination, white and thick vaginal discharge, pain with sex, redness around the vagina
- Causes: Excessive growth of Candida
- Risk factors: Antibiotics, pregnancy, diabetes, HIV/AIDS
- Diagnostic method: Testing the vaginal discharge
- Differential diagnosis: Chlamydia, gonorrhea, bacterial vaginosis
- Treatment: Antifungal medication
- Frequency: 75% of women at some point

Vaginal yeast infection, also known as candidal vulvovaginitis and vaginal thrush, is excessive growth of yeast in the vagina that results in irritation. The most common symptom is vaginal itching, which may be severe. Other symptoms include burning with urination, a thick, white vaginal discharge that typically does not smell bad, pain during sex, and redness around the vagina. Symptoms often worsen just before a period.

Vaginal yeast infections are due to excessive growth of Candida. These yeast are normally present in the vagina in small numbers. Vaginal yeast infections are typically caused by the yeast species Candida albicans. Candida albicans is a common fungus often harbored in the mouth, digestive tract, or vagina without causing adverse symptoms. The causes of excessive Candida growth are not well understood, but some predisposing factors have been identified.

It is not classified as a sexually transmitted infection; however, it may occur more often in those who are frequently sexually active. Risk factors include taking antibiotics, pregnancy, diabetes, and HIV/AIDS. Tight clothing, type of underwear, and personal hygiene do not appear to be factors. Diagnosis is by testing a sample of vaginal discharge. As symptoms are similar to that of the sexually transmitted infections chlamydia and gonorrhea, testing may be recommended.

Treatment is with an antifungal medication. This may be either as a cream such as clotrimazole or with oral medications such as fluconazole. Despite the lack of evidence, wearing cotton underwear and loose fitting clothing is often recommended as a preventive measure. Avoiding douching and scented hygiene products is also recommended. Probiotics have not been found to be useful for active infections.

Around 75% of women have at least one vaginal yeast infection at some point in their lives, while nearly half have at least two. Around 5% have more than three infections in a single year. It is the second most common cause of vaginal inflammation after bacterial vaginosis.

== Signs and symptoms ==
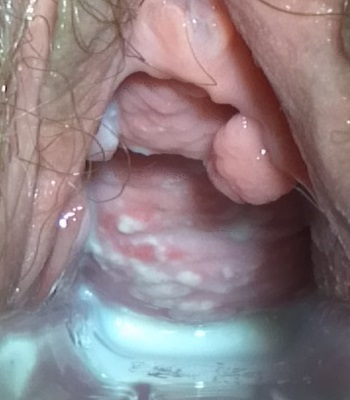
Speculum exam in candidal vulvovaginitis, showing thick, curd-like plaque on the anterior vaginal wall. A slightly erythematous base is visible close to the center of the image, where some of the plaque was scraped off.

The symptoms of vaginal thrush include vulval itching, vulval soreness and irritation, pain or discomfort during sexual intercourse (superficial dyspareunia), pain or discomfort during urination (dysuria) and vaginal discharge, which is usually odourless. Although the vaginal discharge associated with yeast infection is often described as thick and lumpy, like paper paste or cottage cheese, it can also be thin and watery, or thick and of uniform texture. In one study, women with vaginal yeast infection were no more likely to describe their discharge as cottage-cheese like than women without.

As well as the above symptoms of thrush, vulvovaginal inflammation can also be present. The signs of vulvovaginal inflammation include erythema (redness) of the vagina and vulva, vaginal fissuring (cracked skin), edema (swelling from a build-up of fluid), also in severe cases, satellite lesions (sores in the surrounding area). This is rare, but may indicate the presence of another fungal condition, or the herpes simplex virus (the virus that causes genital herpes).

Vaginal candidiasis can very rarely cause congenital candidiasis in newborns.

== Causes and risk factors ==
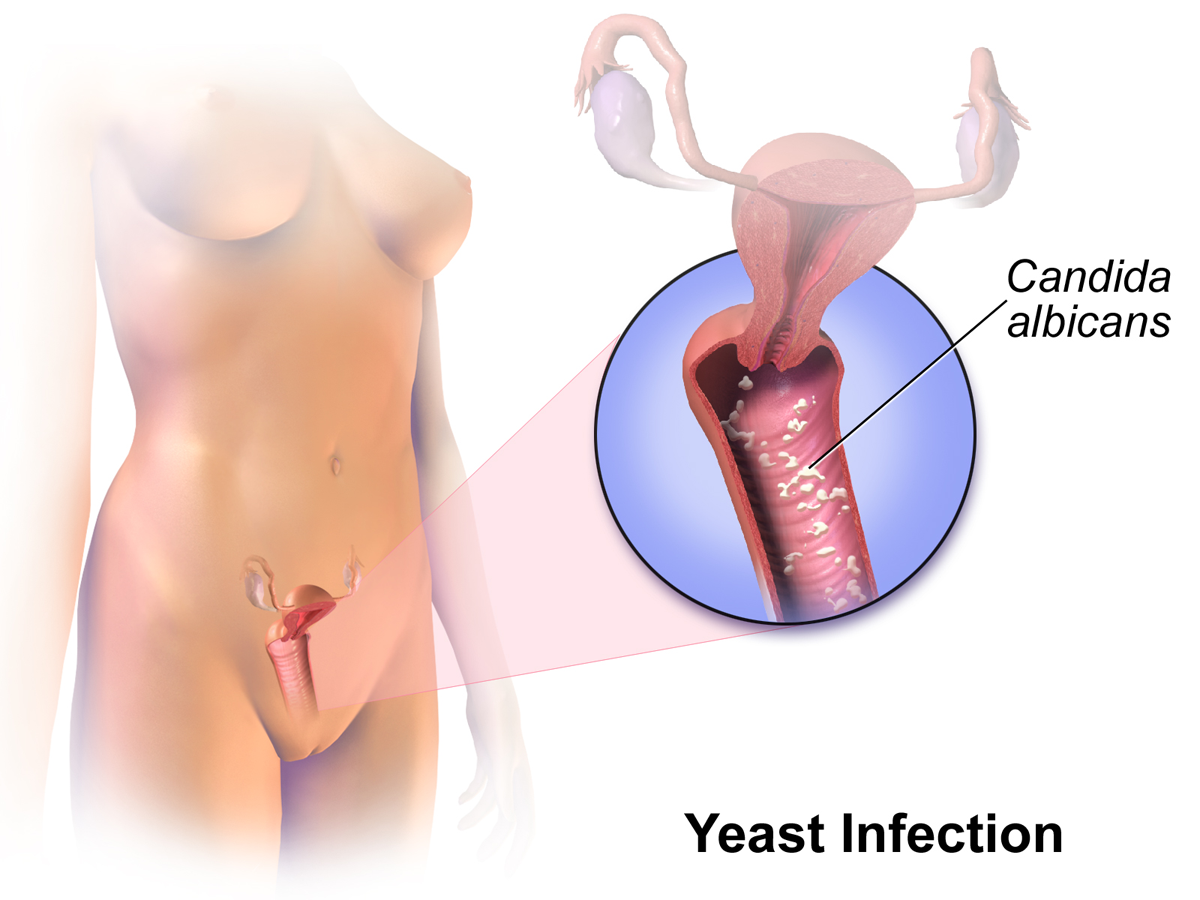
Yeast infection

=== Medications ===
Infection occurs in about 30% of women who are taking a course of antibiotics by mouth. Broad-spectrum antibiotics kill healthy bacteria in the vagina, such as Lactobacillus. These bacteria normally help to limit yeast colonization.

Oral contraceptive use is also associated with increased risk of vaginal thrush.

=== Pregnancy ===
In pregnancy, higher levels of estrogen make a woman more likely to develop a yeast infection. During pregnancy, the Candida fungus is more common, and recurrent infection is also more likely. There is tentative evidence that treatment of asymptomatic candidal vulvovaginitis in pregnancy reduces the risk of preterm birth.

=== Lifestyle ===
While infections may occur without sex, a high frequency of intercourse increases the risk. Personal hygiene methods or tight-fitting clothing, such as tights and thong underwear, do not appear to increase the risk.

=== Diseases ===
Those with poorly controlled diabetes have increased rates of infection while those with well controlled diabetes do not. The risk of developing thrush is also increased when there is poor immune function, as with HIV/AIDS, or in those receiving chemotherapy.

=== Diet ===
A diet high in sugar may increase the risk of vaginal thrush; in some women, reducing sugar intake seems to reduce the risk of reoccurring vaginal thrush.

=== Yeast infection in men ===
Although most common in women, vaginal yeast infections can affect people of any gender who have a vagina. Several studies have found that high testosterone levels, commonly found in trans men and transmasculine nonbinary people, can dramatically reduce Lactobacillus in the vagina, causing vaginal dysbiosis. This increases the risk of both bacterial vaginosis and yeast infection. Application of estradiol cream to the vagina prevents this, although men may have concerns about this treatment due to the administration of estrogen.

== Species of yeast responsible ==
While Candida albicans is the most common yeast species associated with vaginal thrush, infection by other types of yeast can produce similar symptoms. A Hungarian study of 370 patients with confirmed vaginal yeast infections identified the following types of infection:

- Candida albicans: 85.7%
- Non-albicans Candida (8 species): 13.2%
- Saccharomyces cerevisiae: 0.8%
- Candida albicans and Candida glabrata: 0.3%

Non-albicans Candida are often found in complicated cases of vaginal thrush in which the first line of treatment is ineffective. These cases are more likely in those who are immunocompromised.

== Diagnosis ==
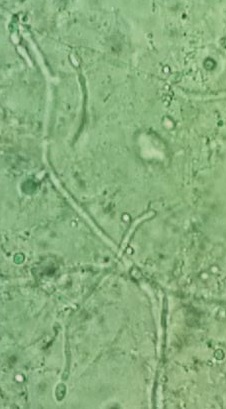
Vaginal wet mount in candidal vulvovaginitis, showing slings of pseudohyphae of Candida albicans. A chlamydospore is visible at left.

Vulvovaginal candidosis is the presence of Candida in addition to vaginal inflammation. The presence of yeast alone is not sufficient, as it could be colonization (biology), part of the microbial consortium normally present in the vagina, its microbiome; the presence of yeast is typically diagnosed in one of three ways: vaginal wet mount microscopy, microbial culture, and antigen tests.

=== Uncomplicated ===
Uncomplicated thrush is when there are less than four episodes in a year, the symptoms are mild or moderate, it is likely caused by Candida albicans, and there are no significant host factors such as poor immune function.

=== Complicated ===
Complicated thrush is four or more episodes of thrush in a year or when severe symptoms of vulvovaginal inflammation are experienced. It is also complicated if coupled with pregnancy, poorly controlled diabetes, poor immune function, or the thrush is not caused by Candida albicans.

=== Recurrent, pathophysiology ===
About 5-8% of the reproductive age female population will have four or more episodes of symptomatic Candida infection per year; this condition is called recurrent vulvovaginal candidiasis (RVVC). Because vaginal and gut colonization with Candida is commonly seen in women with no recurrent symptoms, recurrent symptomatic infections are not simply due to the presence of Candida organisms. There is some support for the theory that RVVC results from an especially intense inflammatory reaction to colonization. Candida antigens can be presented to antigen-presenting cells, which may trigger cytokine production and activate lymphocytes and neutrophils that then cause inflammation and edema.

PRA1 gene (pH-regulated antigen) is strongly up-regulated during vaginal infections, which correlates with inflammation.

== Treatment ==
The following treatments are typically recommended:

- Intravaginal (vaginal suppository): butoconazole, clotrimazole, miconazole, nystatin, tioconazole, terconazole. Candidal vulvovaginitis in pregnancy should be treated with intravaginal clotrimazole or nystatin for at least 7 days. All are more or less equally effective.
- By mouth: ibrexafungerp, fluconazole as a single dose. For severe disease another dose after 3 days may be used.

Short-course topical formulations (i.e., single dose and regimens of 1–3 days) effectively treat uncomplicated candidal vulvovaginitis. The topically applied azole drugs are more effective than nystatin. Treatment with azoles results in relief of symptoms and negative cultures in 80–90% of patients who complete therapy.

The creams and suppositories in this regimen are oil-based and might weaken latex condoms and diaphragms. Treatment for vagina thrush using antifungal medication is ineffective in up to 20% of cases. Treatment for thrush is considered to have failed if the symptoms do not clear within 7–14 days. There are a number of reasons for treatment failure. For example, if the infection is a different kind, such as bacterial vaginosis (the most common cause of abnormal vaginal discharge), rather than thrush.

Vaginal boric acid has evidence of effectiveness against non-C. albicans species.

=== Recurrent ===
For infrequent recurrences, the simplest and most cost-effective management is self-diagnosis and early initiation of topical therapy. However, women whose condition has previously been diagnosed with candidal vulvovaginitis are not necessarily more likely to be able to diagnose themselves; therefore, any woman whose symptoms persist after using an over the counter preparation, or who has a recurrence of symptoms within two months, should be evaluated with office-based testing. Unnecessary or inappropriate use of topical preparations is common and can lead to a delay in the treatment of other causes of vulvovaginitis, which can result in worse outcomes.

When there are more than four recurrent episodes of candidal vulvovaginitis per year, a longer initial treatment course is recommended, such as orally administered fluconazole followed by a second and third dose 3 and 6 days later, respectively.

Other treatments after more than four episodes per year, may include ten days of either oral or topical treatment followed by fluconazole orally once per week for six months. About 10-15% of recurrent candidal vulvovaginitis cases are due to non-Candida albicans species. Non-albicans species tend to have higher levels of resistance to fluconazole. Therefore, recurrence or persistence of symptoms while on treatment indicates speciation and antifungal resistance tests to tailor antifungal treatment.

Vaginal boric acid can be used against recurrent infections, both with C. albicans and with other species, although with C. albicans azoles are generally used instead.

=== Alternative medicine ===
Up to 40% of women seek alternatives to treat vaginal yeast infection. Example products are herbal preparations, probiotics and vaginal acidifying agents. Other alternative treatment approaches include switching contraceptive, treatment of the sexual partner and gentian violet. However, the effectiveness of such treatments has not received much study.

Probiotics (either as pills or as yogurt) do not appear to decrease the rate of occurrence of vaginal yeast infections. No benefit has been found for active infections. Example probiotics purported to treat and prevent candida infections are Lactobacillus fermentum RC-14, Lactobacillus fermentum B-54, Lactobacillus rhamnosus GR-1, Lactobacillus rhamnosus GG and Lactobacillus acidophilus.

There is no evidence to support the use of special cleansing diets and colonic hydrotherapy for prevention.

== Prevention ==
Zinc gel can prevent reinfections.

== Epidemiology ==
The number of cases of vaginal yeast infection is not entirely clear because it is not a reportable disease and it is commonly diagnosed clinically without laboratory confirmation.

Candidiasis is one of the three most common vaginal infections along with bacterial vaginosis and trichomonas. About 75% of women have at least one infection in their lifetime, 40%–45% will have two or more episodes, and approximately 20% of women get an infection yearly.

== Research ==
Vaccines that target C. albicans are under active development. Phase 2 results published in June 2018 showed a safe and high immunogenicity of the NDV-3A vaccine candidate.

== Pathogenisis in Vulvodynia ==
There is a causal link between severe and or recurrent vulvovaginal candidiasis and vulvodynia – a chronic pain condition. The UK Vulval Pain Society highlights: "Some women have a sudden onset of symptoms following a specific event: a commonly recognised event is a severe attack of thrush followed by anti-thrush treatment. Once the attack of thrush settles following treatment, soreness and burning may persist as vestibulodynia". Research on mouse models has found that giving females repeated Candida infections leads to chronic pain in their vulva.

Insults to the highly innervated vulval vestibule lead to hyperalgesia in a process thought to be similar to post-herpetic neuralgia. In some patients, a process of neuroproliferation occurs in which the vestibule grows 10x as many nerves as healthy controls.
