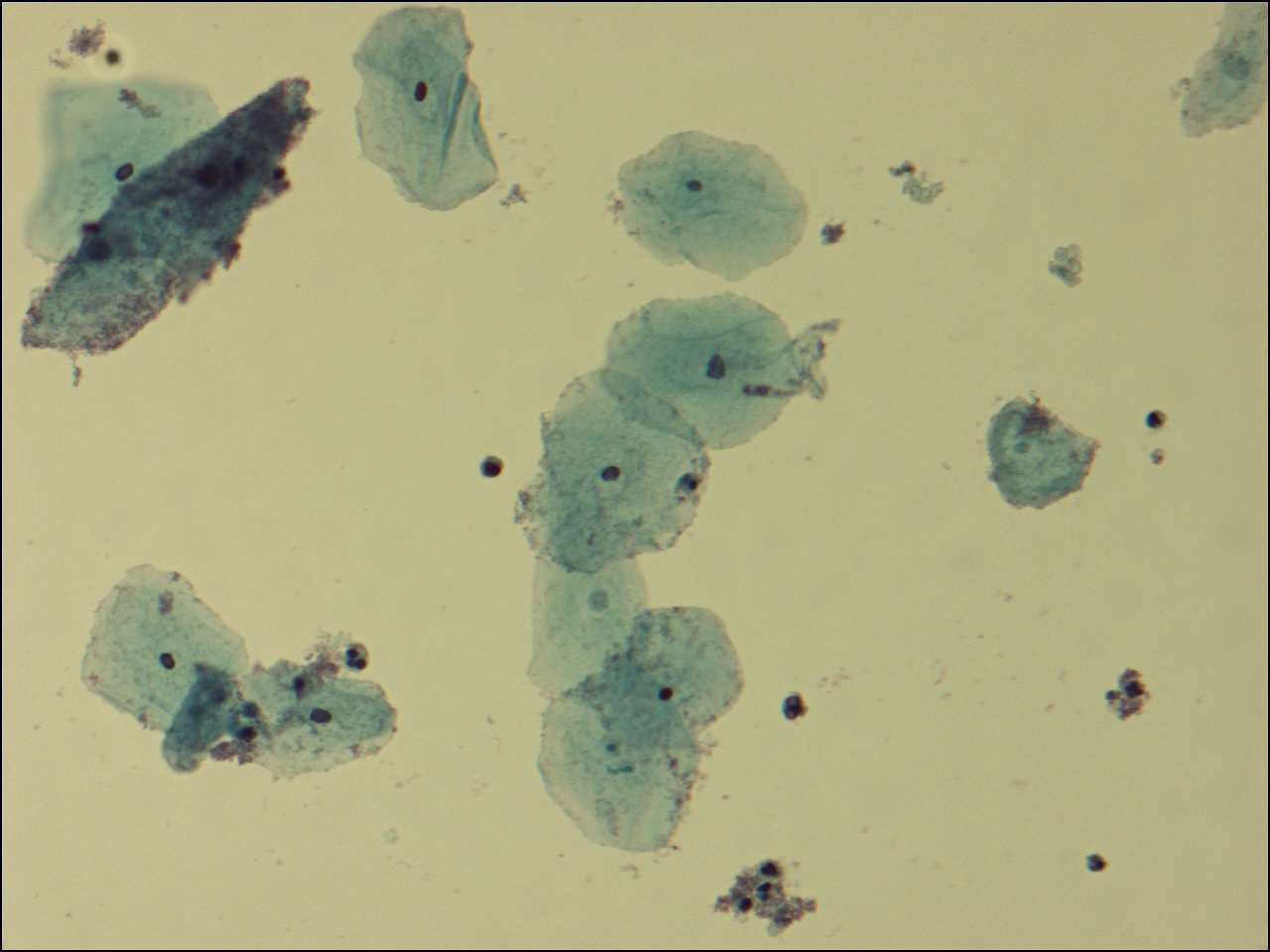
- Microscopic picture of vaginal epithelial clue cells coated with Gardnerella vaginalis, magnified 400 times

Scientific classification
- Domain: Bacteria
- Kingdom: Bacillati
- Phylum: Actinomycetota
- Class: Actinomycetes
- Order: Bifidobacteriales
- Family: Bifidobacteriaceae
- Genus: Gardnerella
- Species: G. vaginalis

Binomial name
- Gardnerella vaginalis (Gardner and Dukes 1955) Greenwood and Pickett 1980

= Gardnerella vaginalis =

Species of bacterium

Gardnerella vaginalis is a species of Gram-variable-staining facultative anaerobic bacteria. The organisms are small (1.0–1.5 μm in diameter) non-spore-forming, nonmotile coccobacilli.

Once classified as Haemophilus vaginalis and afterwards as Corynebacterium vaginalis, G. vaginalis grows as small, circular, convex, gray colonies on chocolate agar; it also grows on HBT agar. A selective medium for G. vaginalis is colistin-oxolinic acid blood agar.

== Clinical significance ==
G. vaginalis is a facultatively anaerobic Gram-variable rod that is involved, together with many other bacteria, mostly anaerobic, in bacterial vaginosis (BV) in some women as a result of a disruption in the normal vaginal microflora. The resident facultative anaerobic Lactobacillus population in the vagina is responsible for the acidic environment. Once the anaerobes have supplanted the normal vaginal bacteria, prescription antibiotics with anaerobic coverage may have to be given to re-establish the equilibrium of the ecosystem. G. vaginalis is not considered the sole cause of the bacterial vaginosis, but a signal organism of the altered microbial ecology associated with overgrowth of many bacterial species.

While typically isolated in genital cultures, it may also be detected in other samples from blood, urine, and the pharynx. Although G. vaginalis is a major species present in bacterial vaginosis, it can also be isolated from women without any signs or symptoms of infection.

It has a Gram-positive cell wall, but, because the cell wall is so thin, it can appear either Gram-positive or Gram-negative under the microscope. It is associated microscopically with clue cells, which are epithelial cells covered in bacteria.

G. vaginalis produces a pore-forming toxin, vaginolysin, which affects only human cells.

Protease and sialidase enzyme activities frequently accompany G. vaginalis.

== Diagnosis ==
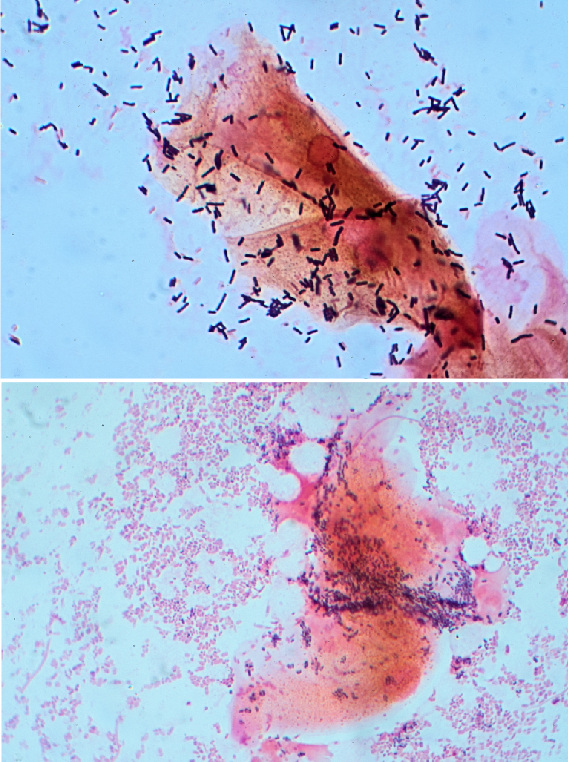
Gram stain of cells from the vagina (the same magnification) with normal bacterial flora (top) and the bacteria that cause vaginosis (bottom).

A variety of diagnosis techniques are currently available for identifying Gardnerella vaginalis such as the OSOM BV Blue assay, FemExam cards and nucleic acid amplification tests (NAATs), resulting in the determination of ongoing BV. The OSOM BV Blue Assay is a chromogenic point-of-care test which can measure sialidase levels in vaginal fluids. As sialidases are produced by bacteria such as Gardnerella and Bacteroides species, similar tests are useful as diagnostic techniques. FemExam, besides detecting vaginal fluid pH and trimethylamine presence, is able to measure proline iminopeptidase activity of G. vaginalis. Finally, the nucleic acid amplification tests (NAATs), such as PCR, are commonly used detection techniques due to their ability to detect as little as one organism in a sample, providing a closer look to Gardnerella vaginalis and BV status.

== Treatment ==
Bacterial vaginosis is commonly treated with topical or oral antibiotics such as metronidazole or clindamycin, which work by targeting G. vaginalis and possibly other anaerobic bacteria. Additionally, a study published in the Journal of Clinical Microbiology described the effectiveness of clindamycin in inhibiting the growth of G. vaginalis in vitro; it was found that clindamycin was able to inhibit the growth of the organism at concentrations as low as 0.25 μg/mL. However, due to high recurrence rates, alternative treatment options for BV are still in development. Vaginal boric acid has been shown to be effective against BV, due to its ability to remove BV-specific biofilms and enhance eradication of G. vaginalis and other potential bacterial pathogens, resulting in reduced recurrence of symptomatic BV. Its mechanism of action is still not fully understood, but its effects on inhibition of bacterial enzymes, biofilm formation and the permeability of bacterial cell walls, potentially make it a useful agent for recurrent BV for further study.

== Symptoms ==
G. vaginalis is associated with bacterial vaginosis, which may be asymptomatic, or may have symptoms including vaginal discharge, vaginal irritation, and a "fish-like" odor. In the amine whiff test, 10% KOH is added to the discharge; a positive result is indicated if a fishy smell is produced. This and other tests can be used to distinguish between vaginal symptoms related to G. vaginalis and those caused by other organisms, such as Trichomonas and Candida albicans, which are similar and may require different treatment. Trichomonas vaginalis and G. vaginalis have similar clinical presentations and can cause a frothy gray or yellow-green vaginal discharge, pruritus, and produce a positive "whiff-test". The two can be distinguished using a wet-mount slide, where a swab of the vaginal epithelium is diluted and then placed onto a slide for observation under a microscope. Gardnerella reveals a classic "clue cell" under the microscope, showing bacteria adhering to the surface of squamous epithelial cells.

== History ==
Gardnerella vaginalis was described in 1953 by Sidney Leopold as a nonmotile, nonencapsulated, pleomorphic gram-negative rod from the vaginas of women who showed symptoms of cervicitis. As though it's been suggested that the organism was related to the genus Haemophilus due to its morphology and growth conditions, the relation between this organism and vaginitis was still an unknown. It was in 1955, when Gardner and Dukes described the microorganism in relation to bacterial vaginosis (BV). Multiple risk factors associated with the development of BV have been identified. However, its exact etiology remains elusive due to its complexity.

== See also ==
- List of bacterial vaginosis microbiota
