= Dequalinium =

Chemical compound

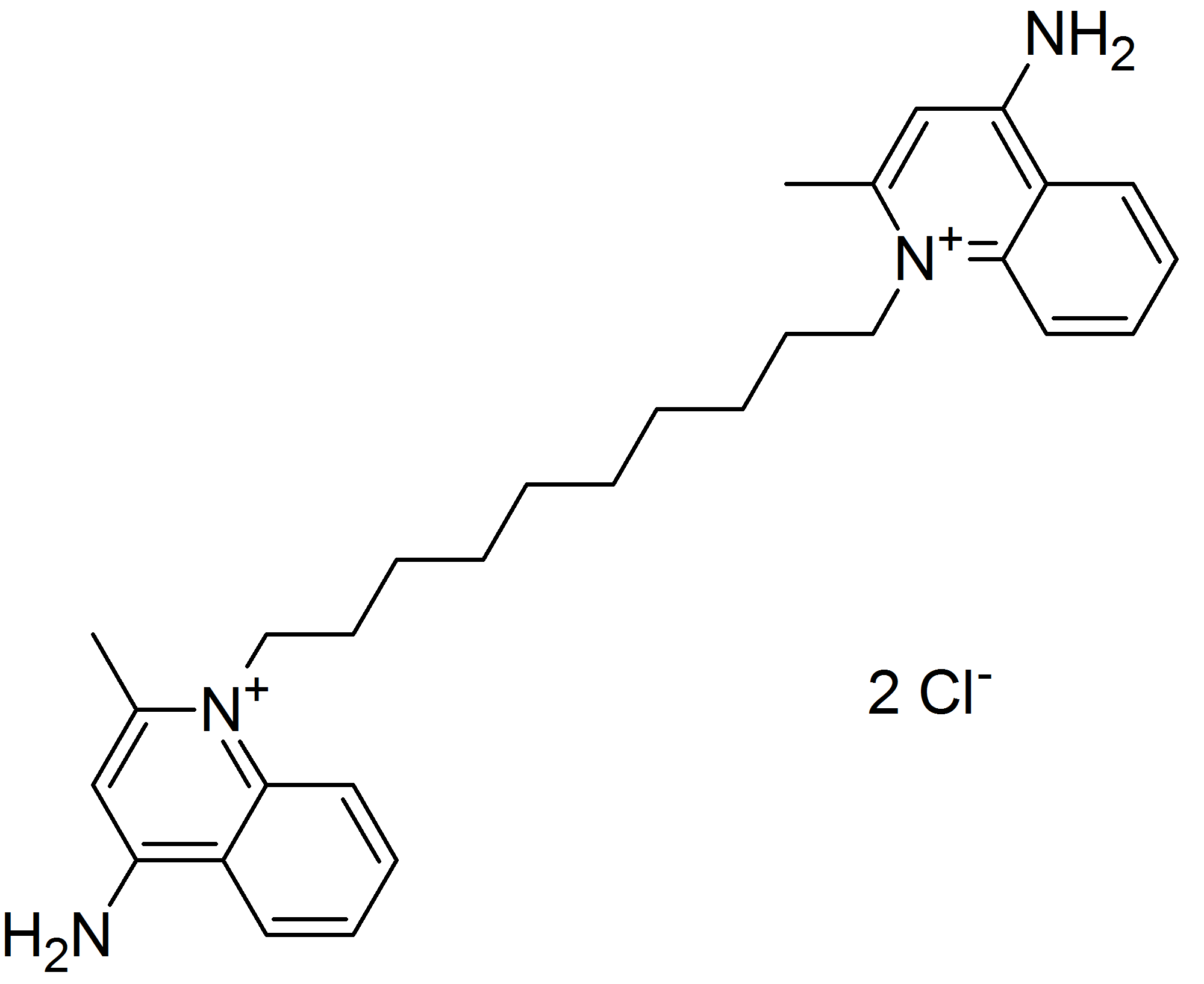

Clinical data
- Trade names: Dequadin, Fluomizin, Vablys, Naxyl, others
- Routes of administration: By mouth, intravaginal
- ATC code: D08AH01 (WHO) G01AC05 (WHO), R02AA02 (WHO)

Legal status
- Legal status: CA: ℞-only; UK: POM (Prescription only)

Identifiers
- IUPAC name: 1,1'-decane-1,10-diylbis(4-amino-2-methylquinolinium) decyl]-2-methyl-4-quinolin-1-iumamine dichloride
- CAS Number: 6707-58-0
- PubChem CID: 2993
- IUPHAR/BPS: 2313
- DrugBank: DB04209
- ChemSpider: 2886
- UNII: E7QC7V26B8
- ChEBI: CHEBI:31466
- ChEMBL: ChEMBL333826; ChEMBL121663
- CompTox Dashboard (EPA): DTXSID3045144
- ECHA InfoCard: 100.007.575

Chemical and physical data
- Formula: C_{30}H_{40}N_{4}
- Molar mass: 456.678 g·mol^{−1}
- 3D model (JSmol): Interactive image
- SMILES: c12ccccc1c(cc([n+]2CCCCCCCCCC[n+]4c3ccccc3c(N)cc4C)C)N
- InChI: InChI=1S/C30H38N4/c1-23-21-27(31)25-15-9-11-17-29(25)33(23)19-13-7-5-3-4-6-8-14-20-34-24(2)22-28(32)26-16-10-12-18-30(26)34/h9-12,15-18,21-22,31-32H,3-8,13-14,19-20H2,1-2H3/p+2; Key:PCSWXVJAIHCTMO-UHFFFAOYSA-P

Dequalinium is a quaternary ammonium cation and bolaamphiphile commonly available as the dichloride salt. It is useful as an antiseptic and disinfectant. The bromide, iodide, acetate, and undecenoate salts are known as well. Dequalinium chloride is the active ingredient of several medications.

The dequalinium dication is symmetrical, containing two quaternary quinolinium units linked by an N-decylene chain.

== Medical uses ==
=== Throat lozenge ===
Dequalinium chloride 0.25 mg is available as an over-the-counter throat lozenge under brand names such as Dequadin and SP Troche. Mouthwash and buccal sprays at 0.5 % concentration are also available. In this form is it used to treat minor infections of the mouth and throat. It can help with tonsillitis but is not effective in cases of streptococci infections.

=== Vaginal antiseptic ===
Dequalinium chloride is available as a 10 mg prescription vaginal tablet for treating vaginal bacterial conditions (i.e. bacterial vaginosis and aerobic vaginitis). Brand names include Fluomizin, Vablys, and Naxyl. It has been available in much of Europe for several decades and was launched in Canada in 2022. It is non-inferior to the antibiotic metronidazole in the treatment of bacterial vaginosis.

=== Topical cream ===
In Austria, dequalinium chloride is combined with bacitracin and diphenylpyraline in Eucillin "B", an antibiotic cream. This cream is the first dequalinium-containing product to enter Austria in 1967.

=== Spectrum of activity ===
Dequalinium salts have broad bactericidal and fungicidal activity. In OTC oral products containing a low concentration, the product is instead described as a bacteriostat.

Dequalinium salts may have antimalarial activities.

== Adverse effects ==
Dequalinium may cause skin necrosis "if administered on intertriginous skin areas under occlusive conditions".

== History ==
Dequalinium was first described by M Babbs and colleagues in 1956, as the first agent of the bisquaternary ammonium chemical class.
