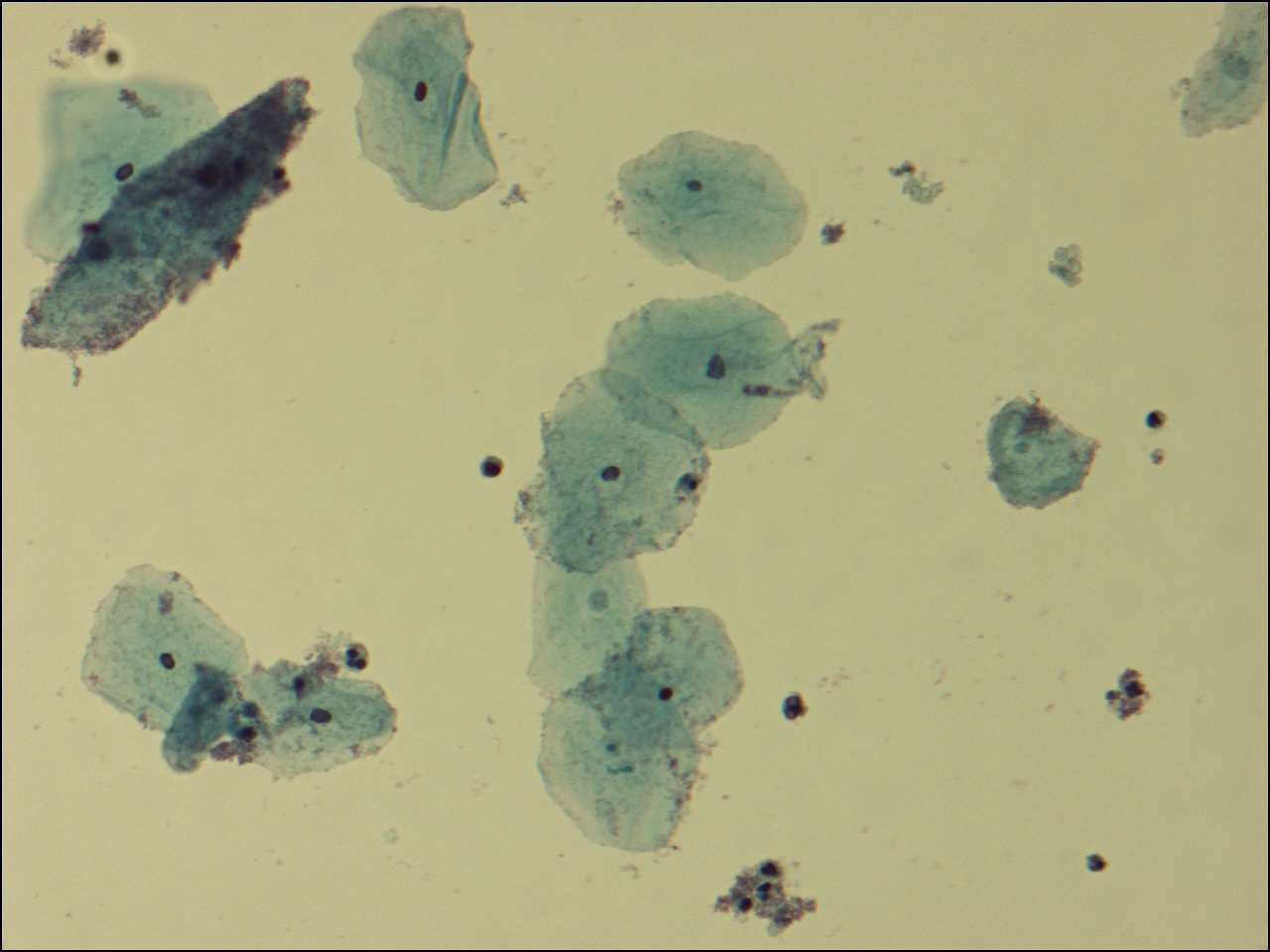
- Microscopic picture of vaginal epithelial clue cells coated with Gardnerella vaginalis, magnified 400 times

Scientific classification
- Domain: Bacteria
- Kingdom: Bacillati
- Phylum: Actinomycetota
- Class: Actinomycetes
- Order: Bifidobacteriales
- Family: Bifidobacteriaceae
- Genus: Gardnerella; Greenwood and Pickett 1980

Species
- Gardnerella greenwoodii Sousa et al. 2023; Gardnerella leopoldii Vaneechoutte et al. 2019; Gardnerella pickettii Sousa et al. 2023; Gardnerella piotii Vaneechoutte et al. 2019; Gardnerella swidsinskii Vaneechoutte et al. 2019; Gardnerella vaginalis (Gardner and Dukes 1955) Greenwood and Pickett 1980

= Gardnerella =

Genus of bacteria

Gardnerella is a genus of Gram-variable-staining facultative anaerobic bacteria.

== Eponym ==
It is named after Hermann L. Gardner (1912–1982), an American bacteriologist who discovered it in 1955.
