= Bacterial vaginosis =

Excessive growth of bacteria in the vagina

- Other names: Anaerobic vaginositis, non-specific vaginitis, vaginal bacteriosis, Gardnerella vaginitis
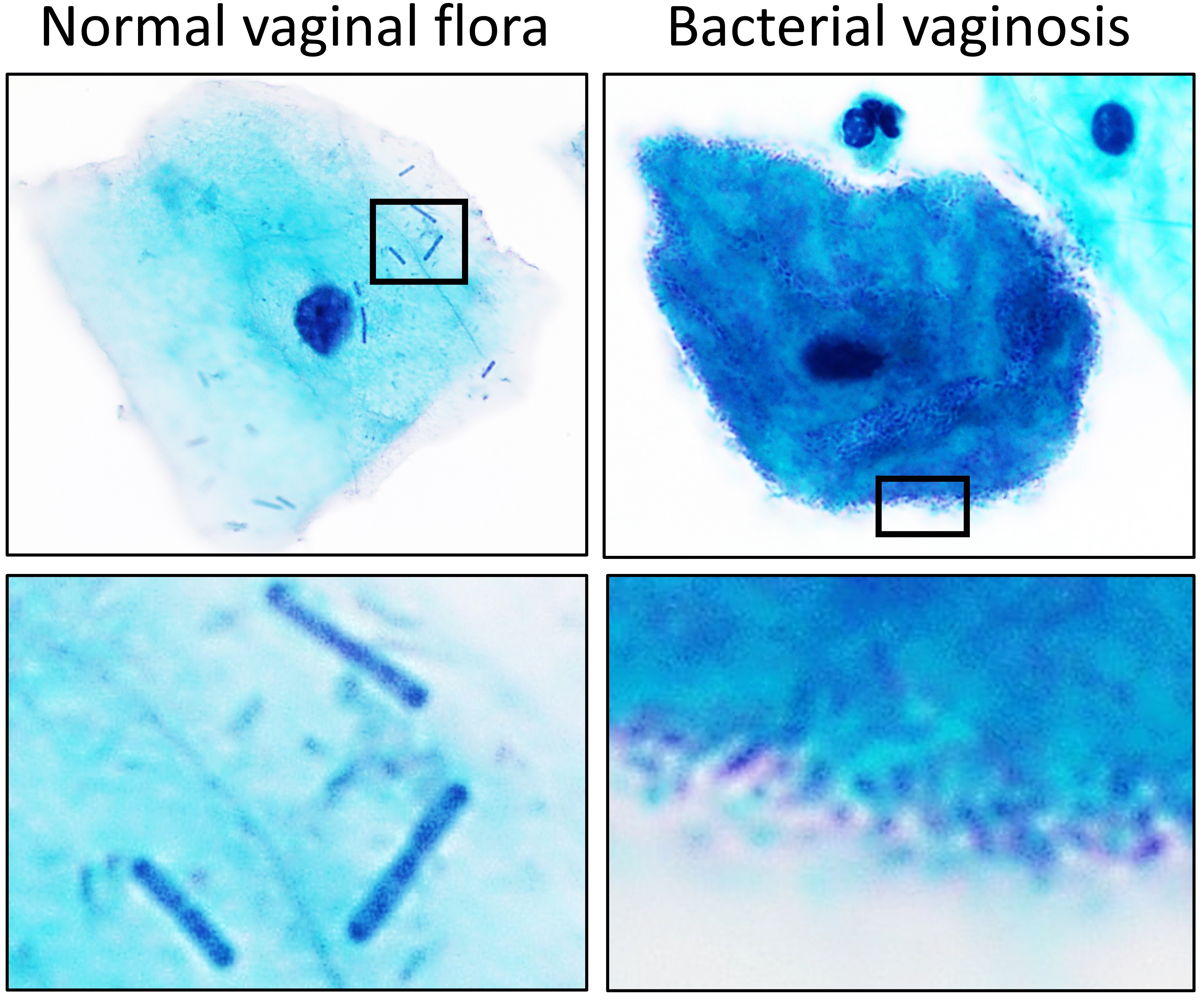
- Vaginal squamous cell with normal vaginal flora versus bacterial vaginosis on Pap stain. Normal vaginal flora (left) is predominantly rod-shaped Lactobacilli whereas in bacterial vaginosis (right) there is an overgrowth of bacteria which can be of multiple species.
- Specialty: Gynecology, infectious disease
- Symptoms: Vaginal discharge that often smells like fish, burning with urination
- Complications: Early delivery among pregnant women
- Causes: Imbalance of the naturally occurring bacteria in the vagina
- Risk factors: Douching, new or multiple sex partners, antibiotics, using an intrauterine device
- Diagnostic method: Testing the vaginal discharge
- Differential diagnosis: Vaginal yeast infection, infection with Trichomonas
- Prevention: Probiotics
- Medication: Clindamycin, metronidazole, tinidazole, secnidazole, boric acid, probiotics
- Frequency: ~ 5% to 70% of women

Bacterial vaginosis (BV) is an infection of the vagina caused by excessive growth of bacteria. Common symptoms include increased vaginal discharge that often smells like fish. The discharge is usually white or gray in color. Burning with urination may occur, though itching during urination is uncommon. Occasionally, there may be no symptoms. Having BV approximately doubles the risk of infection by a number of sexually transmitted infections, including HIV/AIDS. It also increases the risk of early delivery among pregnant women.

BV is caused by an imbalance of the naturally occurring bacteria in the vagina. There is a change in the most common type of bacteria and a hundred to thousandfold increase in total numbers of bacteria present. Typically, bacteria other than Lactobacilli become more common. Risk factors include douching, new or multiple sex partners, antibiotics, and using an intrauterine device, among others. However, it is not considered a sexually transmitted infection and, unlike gonorrhoea and chlamydia, sexual partners are not treated. Diagnosis is suspected based on the symptoms, and may be verified by testing the vaginal discharge and finding a higher than normal vaginal pH, and large numbers of bacteria. BV is often confused with a vaginal yeast infection or infection with Trichomonas.

Usually treatment is with an antibiotic, such as clindamycin or metronidazole. These medications may also be used in the second or third trimesters of pregnancy. The antiseptic boric acid can also be effective. BV often recurs following treatment. Probiotics may help prevent re-occurrence. It is unclear if the use of probiotics or antibiotics affects pregnancy outcomes.

BV is the most common vaginal infection in women of reproductive age. Prevalence differs by countries and demographics, with a systematic review and meta-analysis finding global prevalence in reproductive aged women ranges from 23 to 29%. While BV-like symptoms have been described for much of recorded history, the first clearly documented case occurred in 1894.

== Signs and symptoms ==
Although about 50% of women with BV are asymptomatic, common symptoms include increased vaginal discharge that usually smells like fish. The discharge is often white or gray. There may be burning with urination.

The discharge coats the walls of the vagina, and is usually without significant irritation, pain, or erythema, although mild itching can sometimes occur. By contrast, the normal vaginal discharge will vary in consistency and amount throughout the menstrual cycle and is at its clearest at ovulation—about two weeks before the period starts. Some practitioners claim that BV can be asymptomatic in almost half of affected women, though others argue that this is often a misdiagnosis.

=== Complications ===
Although previously considered a mere nuisance infection, untreated bacterial vaginosis may cause increased susceptibility to sexually transmitted infections, including HIV, and pregnancy complications.

It has been shown that HIV-infected women with bacterial vaginosis (BV) are more likely to transmit HIV to their sexual partners than those without BV. There is evidence of an association between BV and increased rates of sexually transmitted infections such as HIV/AIDS. BV is associated with up to a six-fold increase in HIV shedding. BV is a risk factor for viral shedding and herpes simplex virus type 2 infection. BV may increase the risk of infection with or reactivation of human papillomavirus (HPV).

In addition, bacterial vaginosis, as either pre-existing, or acquired, may increase the risk of pregnancy complications, most notably premature birth or miscarriage. Pregnant women with BV have a higher risk of chorioamnionitis, miscarriage, preterm birth, premature rupture of membranes, and postpartum endometritis. Women with BV who are treated with in vitro fertilization have a lower implantation rate and higher rates of early pregnancy loss.

== Causes ==
Healthy vaginal microbiota consists of species that neither cause symptoms or infections, nor negatively affect pregnancy. It is dominated mainly by Lactobacillus species. BV is defined by the disequilibrium in the vaginal microbiota, with decline in the number of lactobacilli. While the infection involves several bacteria, it is believed that most infections start with Gardnerella vaginalis creating a biofilm, which allows other opportunistic bacteria, such as Prevotella and Bacteroides, to thrive.

One of the main risks for developing BV is douching, which alters the vaginal microbiota and predisposes women to developing BV. Douching is strongly discouraged by the U.S. Department of Health and Human Services and various medical authorities, for this and other reasons.

BV is a risk factor for pelvic inflammatory disease, HIV, sexually transmitted infections (STIs), endometriosis, and reproductive and obstetric disorders or negative outcomes. Although BV can be associated with sexual activity, there is no clear evidence of sexual transmission. It is possible for sexually inactive persons to develop bacterial vaginosis.

Subclinical iron deficiency may correlate with bacterial vaginosis in early pregnancy. A longitudinal study published in February 2006, in the American Journal of Obstetrics and Gynecology, showed a link between psychosocial stress and bacterial vaginosis persisted even when other risk factors were taken into account. Exposure to the spermicide nonoxynol-9 does not affect the risk of developing bacterial vaginosis.

The cause of the fishy smell of BV is mainly due to reduction of trimethylamine oxide (TMAO) to trimethylamine (TMA) by bacteria in vaginal secretion. TMA is the same compound that is predominantly responsible for the smell of decomposing fish. The diamines putrescine and cadaverine, which are the decarboxylation products of arginine and lysine amino acid metabolism, respectively, are also present in BV and may contribute to the fishy smell of the condition as well.

== Diagnosis ==
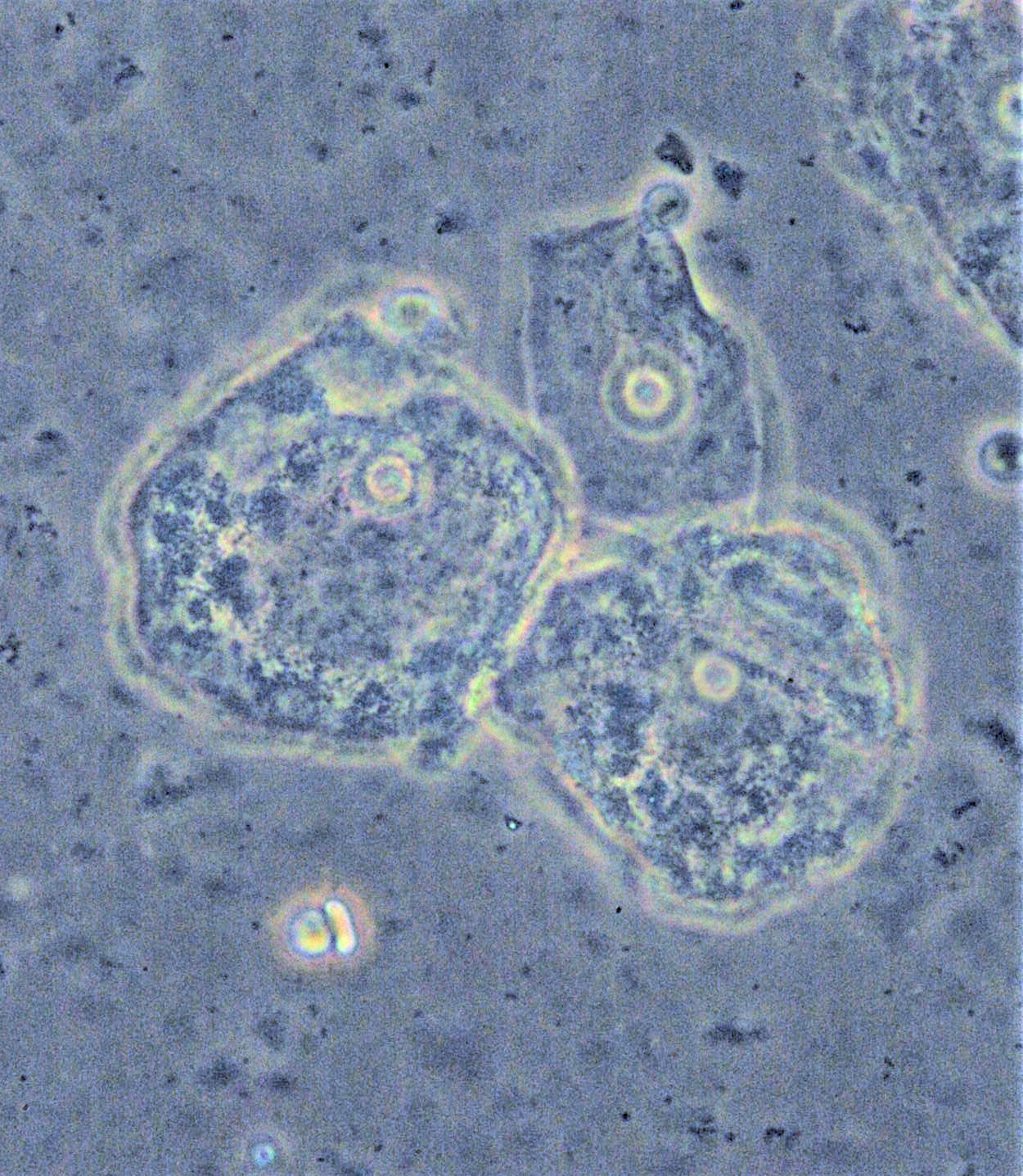
Phase contrast microscopy of clue cells in a vaginal swab

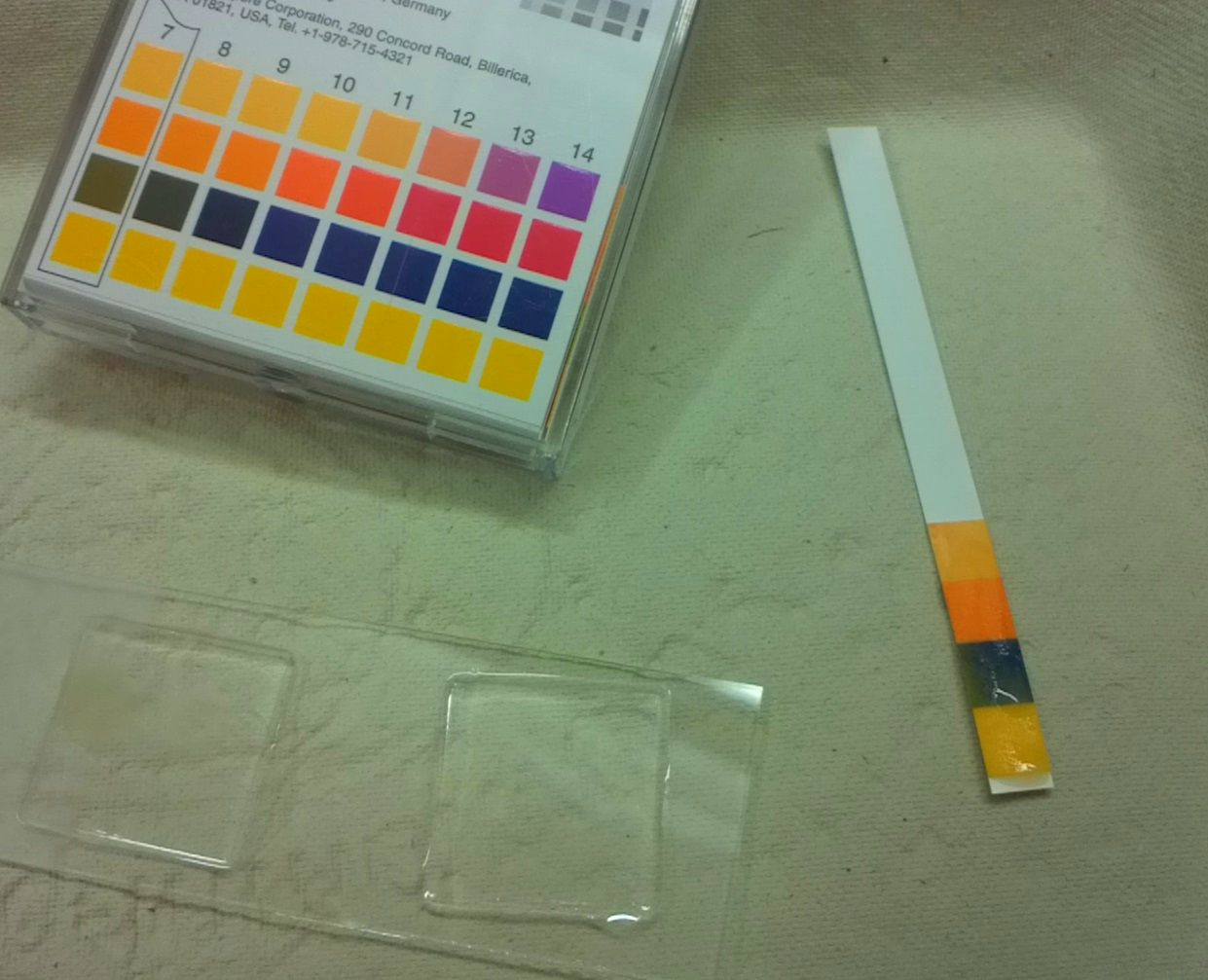
A pH indicator to detect vaginal alkalinization (here showing approximately pH 8), and a microscope slide to detect clue cells microscopically

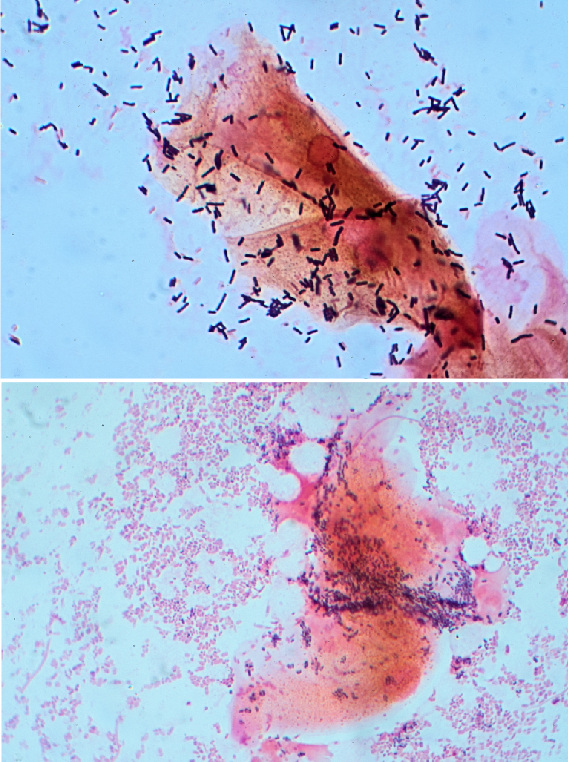
Gram stain of cells from the vagina (the same magnification) with normal bacterial flora (top) and the bacteria that cause vaginosis (bottom).

To make a diagnosis of bacterial vaginosis, a swab from inside the vagina should be obtained. These swabs can be tested for:

- Gram stain which shows the depletion of lactobacilli and overgrowth of Gardnerella vaginalis bacteria. A Gram stain of vaginal secretions usually confirms bacterial vaginosis.
- A characteristic "fishy" odor on wet mount. This test, called the whiff test, is performed by adding a small amount of potassium hydroxide to a microscope slide containing the vaginal discharge. A characteristic fishy odor is considered a positive whiff test and is suggestive of bacterial vaginosis. Addition of a base to vaginal secretion with the diamines putrescine and cadaverine causes them to become volatile and thereby produce a more intense fishy smell.
- Loss of acidity. To control bacterial growth, the vagina is normally slightly acidic with a pH of 3.8–4.2. A swab of the discharge is put onto litmus paper to check its acidity. A pH greater than 4.5 is considered alkaline and is suggestive of bacterial vaginosis.
- The presence of clue cells on wet mount. Similar to the whiff test, the test for clue cells is performed by placing a drop of sodium chloride solution on a slide containing vaginal discharge. If present, clue cells can be visualized under a microscope. They are so-named because they give a clue to the reason behind the discharge. These are epithelial cells that are coated with bacteria.

Differential diagnosis for bacterial vaginosis includes the following:

- Normal vaginal discharge.
- Candidiasis (thrush, or a yeast infection).
- Trichomoniasis, an infection caused by Trichomonas vaginalis.
- Aerobic vaginitis

The Centers for Disease Control and Prevention (CDC) defines STIs as "a variety of clinical syndromes and infections caused by pathogens that can be acquired and transmitted through sexual activity." But the CDC does not specifically identify BV as a sexually transmitted infection.

=== Amsel criteria ===
In clinical practice, BV can be diagnosed using the Amsel criteria:

1. Thin, white, yellow, homogeneous discharge
2. Clue cells on microscopy
3. pH of vaginal fluid >4.5
4. Release of a fishy odor on adding alkali—10% potassium hydroxide (KOH) solution.

At least three of the four criteria should be present for a confirmed diagnosis. A modification of the Amsel criteria accepts the presence of two instead of three factors and is considered equally diagnostic.

=== Gram stain ===
An alternative is to use a Gram-stained vaginal smear, with the Hay/Ison criteria or the Nugent criteria. The Hay/Ison criteria are defined as follows:

- Grade 1 (Normal): Lactobacillus morphotypes predominate.
- Grade 2 (Intermediate): Some lactobacilli present, but Gardnerella or Mobiluncus morphotypes also present.
- Grade 3 (Bacterial Vaginosis): Predominantly Gardnerella and/or Mobiluncus morphotypes. Few or absent lactobacilli. (Hay et al., 1994)

Gardnerella vaginalis is the main culprit in BV. Gardnerella vaginalis is a short, Gram-variable rod (coccobacillus). Hence, the presence of clue cells and gram variable coccobacilli is indicative or diagnostic of bacterial vaginosis.

=== Nugent score ===
The Nugent score is now rarely used by physicians due to the time it takes to read the slides and requires the use of a trained microscopist. A score of 0–10 is generated from combining three other scores. The scores are as follows:

- 0–3 is considered negative for BV
- 4–6 is considered intermediate
- 7+ is considered indicative of BV.

At least 10–20 high power (1000× oil immersion) fields are counted and an average determined.

Lactobacillus morphotypes – average per high-powered (1000× oil immersion) field. View multiple fields.	Gardnerella / Bacteroides morphotypes – average per high powered (1000× oil immersion) field. View multiple fields.	Curved Gram variable rods – average per high-powered (1000× oil immersion) field. View multiple fields (note that this factor is less important – scores of only 0–2 are possible)
Score 0 for >30; Score 1 for 15–30; Score 2 for 14; Score 3 for <1 (this is an average, so results can be >0, yet <1); Score 4 for 0	Score 0 for 0; Score 1 for <1 (this is an average, so results can be >0, yet <1); Score 2 for 1–4; Score 3 for 5–30; Score 4 for >30	Score 0 for 0; Score 1 for <5; Score 2 for 5+

DNA hybridization testing with Affirm VPIII was compared to the Gram stain using the Nugent criteria. The Affirm VPIII test may be used for the rapid diagnosis of BV in symptomatic women but uses expensive proprietary equipment to read results, and does not detect other pathogens that cause BV, including Prevotella spp, Bacteroides spp, and Mobiluncus spp. The cervicovaginal microbiome measured using 16S rRNA sequencing has the capacity to increase throughput of the Nugent Score and has demonstrate to be directly comparable to clinical Nugent Score measurement.

=== Screening ===
Screening during pregnancy is not recommended in the United States as of 2020, because "the US Preventive Services Task Force concludes that the current evidence is insufficient to assess the balance of benefits and harms of screening for bacterial vaginosis in pregnant persons at increased risk for preterm delivery".

== Prevention ==
Some steps suggested to lower the risk include not douching, not using perfumed soaps and limiting the number of sex partners.

Systematic reviews and meta-analyses from 2022 to 2023 have concluded that probiotics may help prevent re-occurrence.

Early evidence suggested that antibiotic treatment of male partners could re-establish the normal microbiota of the male urogenital tract and prevent the recurrence of infection. However, a 2016 Cochrane review found high-quality evidence that treating the sexual partners of women with bacterial vaginosis had no effect on symptoms, clinical outcomes, or recurrence in the affected women. It also found that such treatment may lead treated sexual partners to report increased adverse events.

== Treatment ==
=== Antibiotics ===
Treatment is typically with the antibiotics metronidazole or clindamycin. They can be either given by mouth or applied inside the vagina with similar efficacy. Other antibiotics related to metronidazole, including tinidazole and the newer secnidazole, are also approved and used to treat BV. When clindamycin is given to pregnant women symptomatic with BV before 22 weeks of gestation the risk of pre-term birth before 37 weeks of gestation is lower. Additional antibiotics that are not approved for treatment of BV but might work include macrolides, lincosamides, and penicillins.

Although antibiotics are effective, about 10% to 15% of people do not improve with the first course of antibiotics, and recurrence rates of up to 80% have been documented. Recurrence rates are increased with sexual activity with the same pre-/post-treatment partner and inconsistent condom use.

BV is not considered a sexually transmitted infection, and antibiotic treatment of a male sexual partner of a woman with BV is not recommended.

=== Antiseptics ===
Topical antiseptics, for example dequalinium chloride, policresulen, hexetidine, povidone-iodine, or boric acid vaginal suppositories may be applied, if the risk of ascending infections is low (outside of pregnancy and in immunocompetent people without histories of upper genital tract infections).

Dequalinium chloride is available as a prescription vaginal tablet, for instance in Europe and Canada, is given as a 6-day course, and is non-inferior to metronidazole in the treatment of bacterial vaginosis. Povidone-iodine is approved as a vaginal gel to treat bacterial vaginosis under the brand name Astrodimer, among others. One study found that vaginal irrigations with hydrogen peroxide (3%) resulted in a slight improvement, but this was much less than with the use of oral metronidazole. Dequalinium chloride and povidone-iodine (as Astrodimer) have the best evidence of effectiveness. Neither of these are available in the United States, though they are available in other countries. Intravaginal boric acid, alone or in conjunction with other medications, may be helpful in the treatment of recurrent BV.

TOL-463, an experimental formulation of boric acid enhanced with ethylenediaminetetraacetic acid (EDTA), is under development as an intravaginal medication for the treatment of BV and has shown preliminary effectiveness in clinical trials.

=== Probiotics ===
A 2009 Cochrane review found tentative but insufficient evidence for probiotics as a treatment for BV. A 2014 review reached the same conclusion. A 2013 review found some evidence supporting the use of probiotics during pregnancy. The preferred probiotics for BV are those containing high doses of lactobacilli (around 10^{9} CFUs) given in the vagina. Intravaginal administration is preferred to taking them by mouth. Prolonged repetitive courses of treatment appear to be more promising than short courses.

The lack of effectiveness of commercially available Lactobacillus probiotics may be because most do not contain vaginal lactobacilli strains. LACTIN-V is a live biopharmaceutical medication containing the vaginally important Lactobacillus crispatus which is under development for the treatment of bacterial vaginosis and recurrent urinary tract infections. It has shown initial effectiveness in considerably reducing recurrence of bacterial vaginosis following antibiotic treatment. LACTIN-V is not yet Food and Drug Administration (FDA)-approved or commercially available.

=== Miscellaneous ===
Estrogen-containing contraceptives have been found to decrease recurrence of BV.

== Epidemiology ==
BV is the most common infection of the vagina in women of reproductive age. The percentage of women affected at any given time varies between 5% and 70%. BV is most common in parts of Africa, and least common in Asia and Europe. In the United States, about 30% of those between the ages of 14 and 49 are affected. Rates vary considerably between ethnic groups within a country.
