= Vaginal discharge =

Liquid mixture produced by the vagina

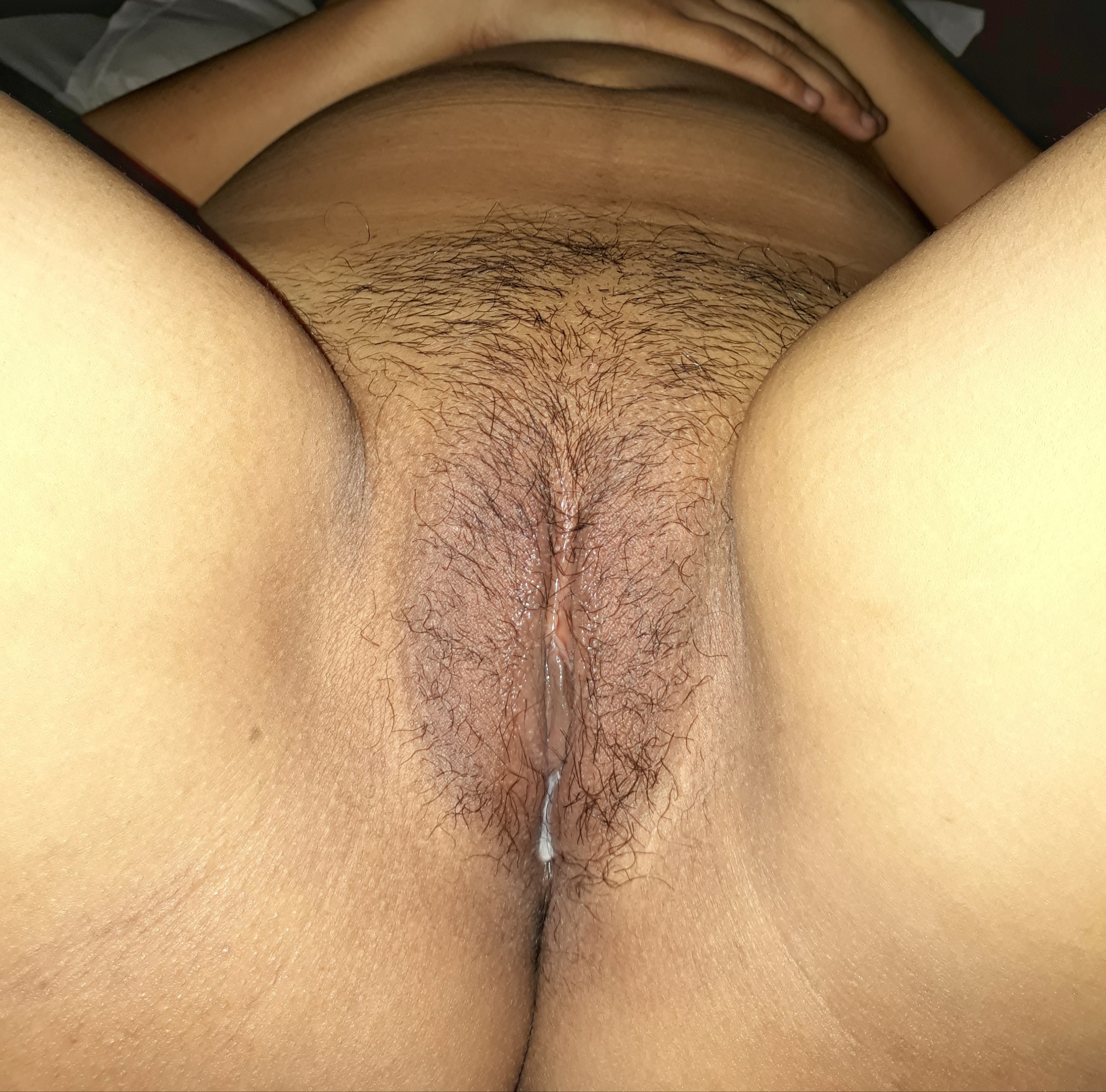

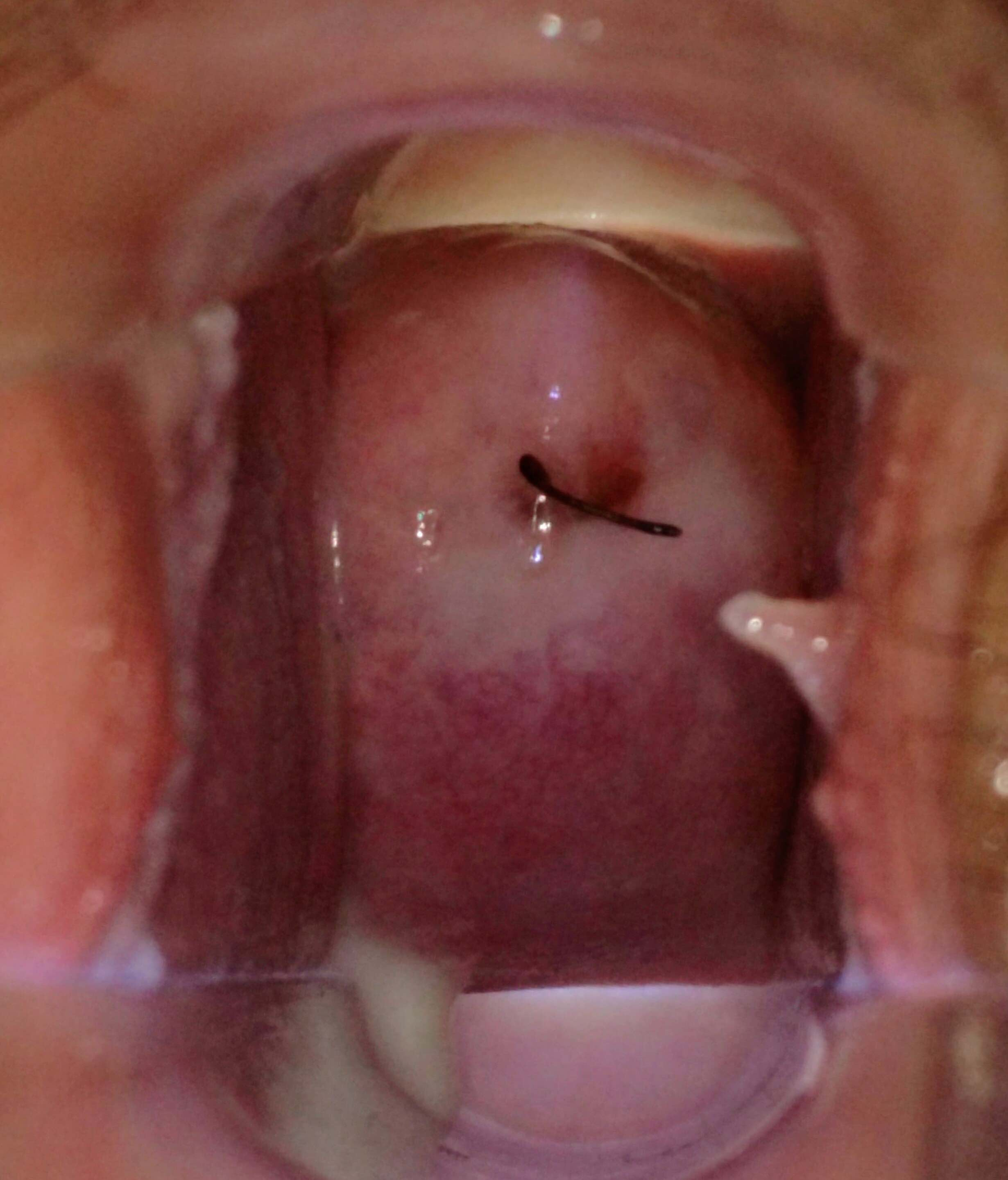
Photo of a cervix (front) and the walls of a vaginal canal (surrounding the cervix) in which a camera is inserted into the canal using a medical speculum. The cervix and walls of the canal are coated with the mixture of liquid, cells, and bacteria that form the vaginal discharge when it escapes through the vaginal opening.

Vaginal discharge is a mixture of liquid, cells, and bacteria that lubricate and protect the vagina. This mixture is constantly produced by the cells of the vagina and cervix, and it exits the body through the vaginal opening. The composition, quality, and amount of discharge varies between individuals, and can vary throughout the menstrual cycle and throughout the stages of sexual and reproductive development. Normal vaginal discharge may have a thin, watery consistency or a thick, sticky consistency, and it may be clear or white in color. Normal vaginal discharge may be large in volume but typically does not have a strong odor, nor is it typically associated with itching or pain.

While most discharge is considered physiologic (represents normal functioning of the body), some changes in discharge can reflect infection or other pathological processes. Infections that may cause changes in vaginal discharge include vaginal yeast infections, bacterial vaginosis, and sexually transmitted infections. The characteristics of abnormal vaginal discharge vary depending on the cause, but common features include a change in color, a foul odor, and associated symptoms such as itching, burning, pelvic pain, or pain during sexual intercourse.

== Normal discharge ==
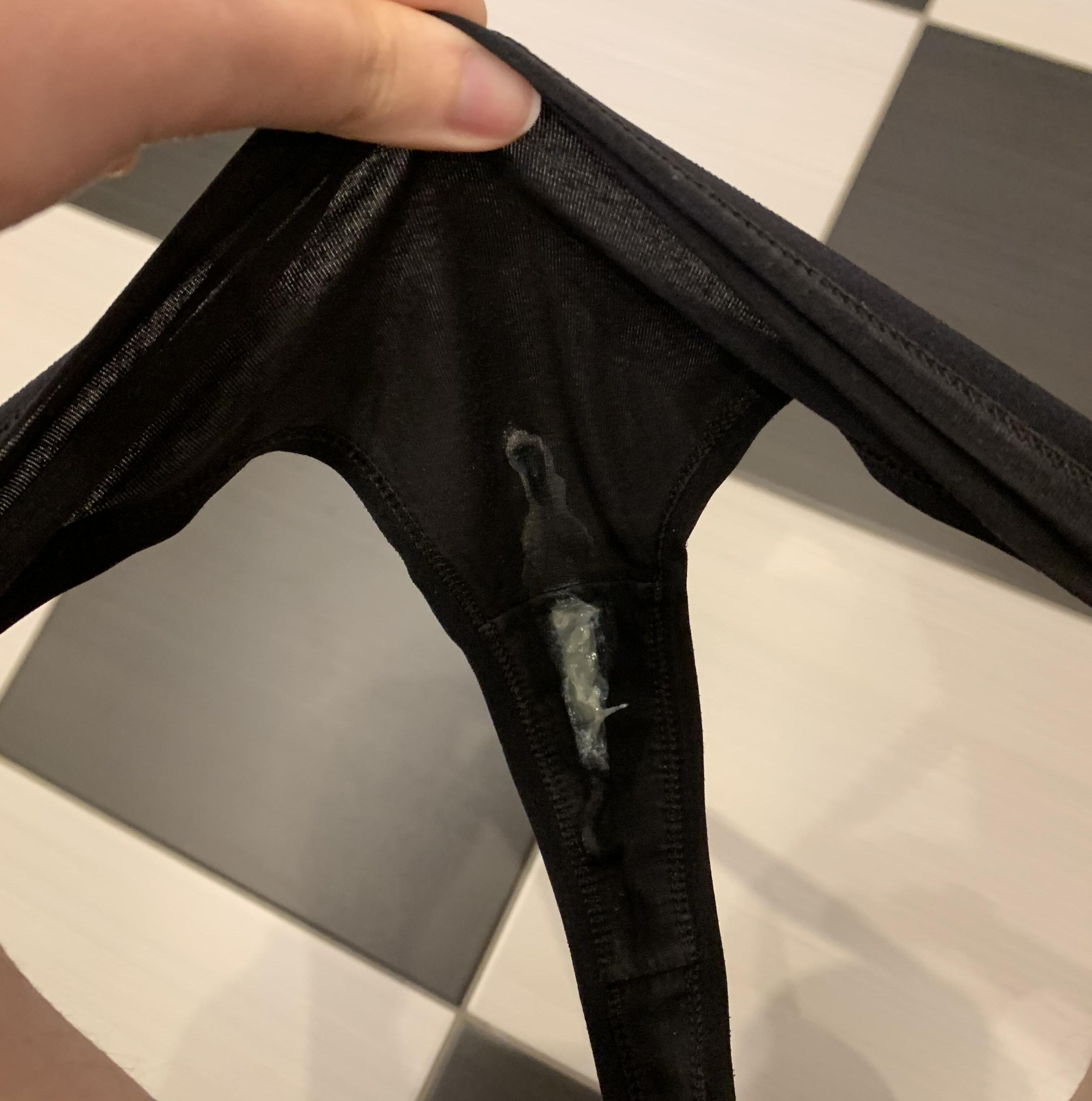
Stretchy discharge around ovulation

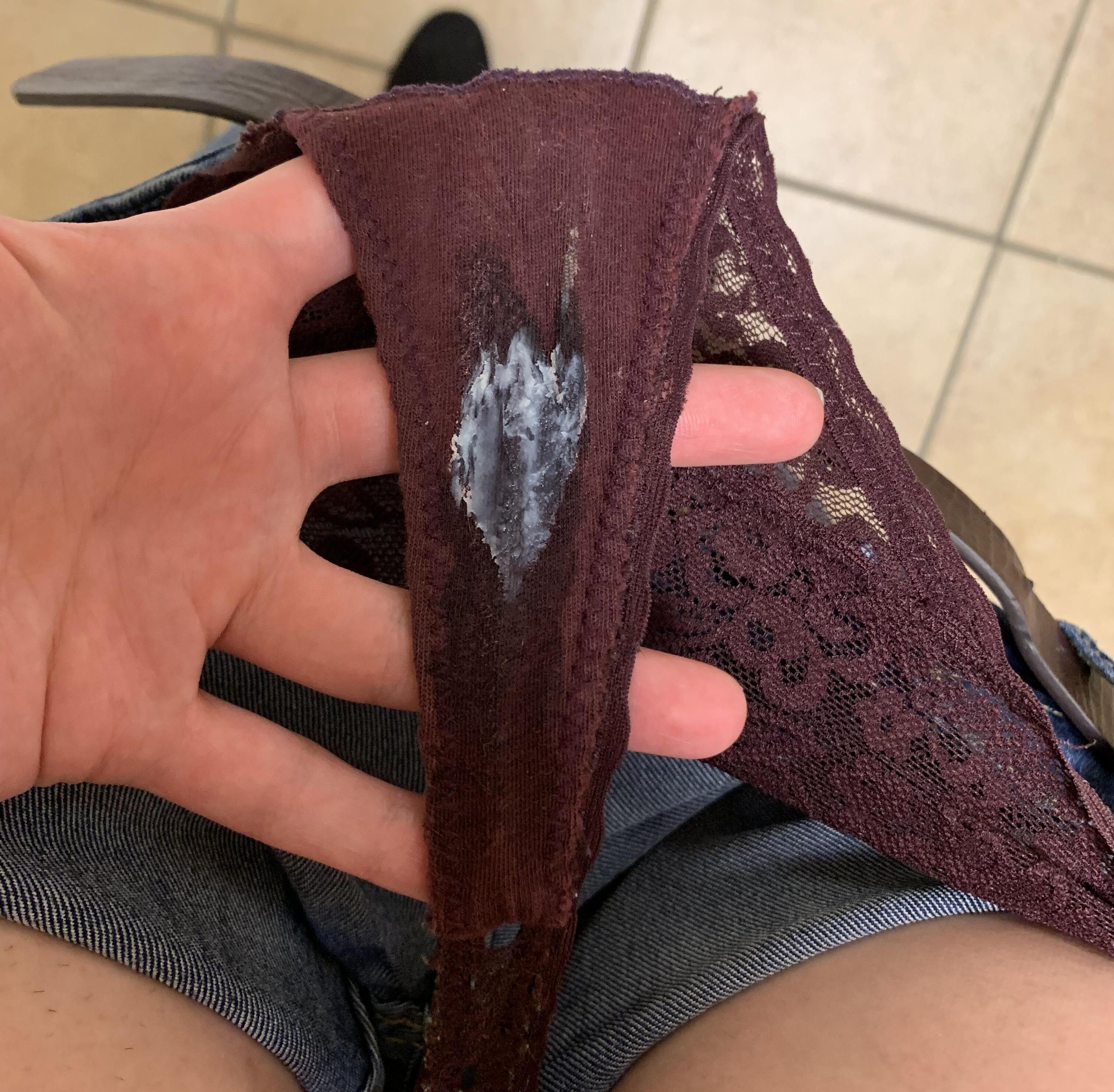
Thick discharge around menstruation

Normal vaginal discharge is composed of cervical mucus, vaginal fluid, shedding vaginal and cervical cells, and bacteria.

The majority of the liquid in vaginal discharge is mucus produced by glands of the cervix. The rest is made up of transudate from the vaginal walls and secretions from glands (Skene's and Bartholin's). The solid components or elements are exfoliated epithelial cells from the vaginal wall and cervix as well as some of the bacteria that inhabit the vagina. These bacteria that live in the vagina do not typically cause disease. In fact, they can protect the individual from other infectious and invasive bacteria by producing substances such as lactic acid and hydrogen peroxide that inhibit the growth of other bacteria. The normal composition of bacteria in the vagina (vaginal flora) can vary, but is most commonly dominated by lactobacilli. On average, there are approximately 10^{8} to 10^{9} bacteria per milliliter of vaginal discharge.

Normal vaginal discharge is clear, white, or off-white. The consistency can range from milky to clumpy, and odor is typically mild to non-existent. The majority of the discharge pools in the deepest portion of the vagina (the posterior fornix) and exits the body over the course of a day with the force of gravity. A typical reproductive-age woman produces 1.5 grams (half to one teaspoon) of vaginal discharge every day.

During sexual arousal and sexual intercourse, the amount of fluid in the vagina increases due to engorgement of blood vessels surrounding the vagina. This engorgement of blood vessels increases the volume of transudate from the vaginal walls. Transudate has a neutral pH, so increases in its production can temporarily shift vaginal pH to be more neutral. Semen has a basic pH and can neutralize the acidity of the vagina for up to eight hours.

The composition and amount of vaginal discharge changes as an individual goes through the various stages of sexual and reproductive development.

However, some individuals may experience changes in vaginal discharge due to underlying conditions such as stress, diabetes, inflammatory disorders, lactation, certain medications, or autoimmune diseases.

=== Neonatal ===
In neonates, vaginal discharge sometimes occurs in the first few days after birth. This is due to exposure to estrogen while in utero. Neonatal vaginal discharge may be white or clear with a mucous texture, or it may be bloody from normal transient shedding of the endometrium.

=== Pediatric ===
The vagina of girls before puberty is thinner and has a different bacterial flora. Vaginal discharge in pre-pubertal girls is minimal with a neutral to alkaline pH ranging from 6 to 8. The composition of the bacterial population in pre-pubertal girls is dominated by Staphylococcus species, in addition to a range of anaerobes, enterococci, E. coli, and Lactobacillus species.

=== Puberty ===
During puberty, the hormone oestrogen begins to be produced by the ovaries. Even before the beginning of menses (up to 12 months before menarche, typically at the same time as the development of breast buds) vaginal discharge increases in amount and changes in composition. Estrogen matures vaginal tissues and causes increased production of glycogen by epithelial cells of the vagina. These higher levels of glycogen in the vaginal canal support the growth of lactobacilli over other bacterial species. When lactobacilli use glycogen as a food source, they convert it to lactic acid. Therefore, the predominance of lactobacilli in the vaginal canal creates a more acidic environment. In fact, the pH of the vagina and vaginal discharge after puberty ranges between 3.5 and 4.7.

=== Menstrual cycle ===
The amount and consistency of vaginal discharge change with the menstrual cycle. In the days right after menstruation, vaginal discharge is minimal, and its consistency is thick and sticky. When approaching ovulation, the rising estrogen levels cause a concomitant increase in vaginal discharge. The amount of discharge produced at ovulation is 30 times greater than the amount produced directly following menstruation. The discharge also changes in color and consistency during this time, becoming clear with an elastic consistency, often likened to the colour and texture of egg whites. After ovulation the body's progesterone levels increase, which causes a decrease in the amount of vaginal discharge. The consistency of the discharge once again becomes thick and sticky and opaque in color. The discharge continues to decrease from the end of ovulation until the end of menstruation, and then after menstruation, it begins its rise again.

=== Pregnancy ===
During pregnancy, vaginal discharge volume increases as a result of the body's increased levels of estrogen and progesterone. The discharge is usually white or slightly gray, and may have a musty smell. The normal discharge of pregnancy does not contain blood or cause itching. The pH of the vaginal discharge in pregnancy tends to be more acidic than normal due to increased production of lactic acid. This acidic environment helps to provide protection from many infections, though conversely it also makes women more susceptible to vaginal yeast infections.

==== Postpartum ====
Postpartum discharge, called lochia, may be red and heavy for the first few days as it consists of blood and the superficial mucous membrane that lined the uterus during pregnancy. This discharge normally begins to taper and should become more watery and change in color from pinkish brown to yellowish white.

=== Menopause ===
With the drop in estrogen levels that comes with menopause, the vagina returns to a state similar to pre-puberty. Specifically, the vaginal tissues thin, and become less elastic; blood flow to the vagina decreases; the surface epithelial cells contain less glycogen. With decreased levels of glycogen, the vaginal flora shifts to contain fewer lactobacilli, and the pH subsequently increases to a range of 6.0-7.5. The overall amount of vaginal discharge decreases in menopause. While this is normal, it can lead to symptoms of dryness and pain during penetrative sexual intercourse. These symptoms can often be treated with vaginal moisturizers/lubricants or vaginal hormone creams.

== Abnormal discharge ==
Abnormal discharge can occur in a number of conditions, including infections and imbalances in vaginal flora or pH. Sometimes, abnormal vaginal discharge may not have a known cause. In one study looking at women presenting to clinic with concerns about vaginal discharge or a foul smell in their vagina, it was found that 34% had bacterial vaginosis and 23% had vaginal candidiasis (yeast infection). 32% of patients were found to have sexually transmitted infections including chlamydia, gonorrhea, trichomonas, or genital Herpes. Diagnosing the cause of abnormal vaginal discharge can be difficult, though a potassium hydroxide test or vaginal pH analysis may be used. When abnormal discharge occurs with burning, irritation, or itching on the vulva, it is called vaginitis.

It is important to seek care when abnormal vaginal discharge or changes to vaginal discharge are noticed. Associated symptoms with pathological causes of vaginal discharge include: itching of the exterior genitalia, irritation or inflammation of the external genitalia, green or foam-like discharge, bloody discharge not associated with menstruation, different odors, new or worsening pain associated with the discharge, or pain with sex or urination. Self-treatment is not recommended and can worsen symptoms.

Upon the diagnosis of vaginitis, a speculum exam is performed to evaluate the vagina, vaginal discharge, and the cervix. The physician will insert the speculum into the vagina while the patient lies on their back to exam for foreign bodies, vaginal warts, inflammation, as well as rashes/bruises. A sample of the vaginal discharge is then collected using a cotton-swab and tested for pH and under microscopy. The most common causes of pathological vaginal discharge in adolescents and adults are described below.

=== Bacterial vaginosis ===
Bacterial vaginosis (BV) is an infection caused by a change in the vaginal flora, which refers to the community of organisms that live in the vagina. It is the most common cause of pathological vaginal discharge in women of childbearing age and accounts for 40–50% of cases. In BV, the vagina experiences a decrease in a bacterium called lactobacilli, and a relative increase in a multitude of anaerobic bacteria with the most predominant being Gardnerella vaginalis. This imbalance results in the characteristic vaginal discharge experienced by patients with BV. The discharge in BV has a characteristic strong fishy odor, which is caused by the relative increase in anaerobic bacteria. The discharge is typically thin and grey, or occasionally green. It sometimes is accompanied by burning with urination. Itching is rare. The exact reasons for the disruption of vaginal flora leading to BV are not fully known. However, factors associated with BV include antibiotic use, unprotected sex, douching, and using an intrauterine device (IUD). The role of sex in BV is unknown, and BV is not considered an STI. The diagnosis of BV is made by a health care provider based on the appearance of the discharge, discharge pH > 4.5, presence of clue cells, when viewing the collected discharge from speculum exam under the microscope, and a characteristic fishy odor when the discharge is placed on a slide and combined with potassium hydroxide ("whiff test"). The gold standard for diagnosis is a gram stain showing a relative lack of lactobacilli and a polymicrobial array of gram negative rods, gram variable rods, and cocci. BV may be treated with oral or intravaginal antibiotics, such as metronidazole, or lactobacillus.

=== Vaginal yeast infection ===
Vaginal yeast infection or vaginal candidiasis results from overgrowth of candida albicans, or yeast, in the vagina. This is a relatively common infection, with over 75% of women having experienced at least one yeast infection at some point in their life. Risk factors for yeast infections include recent antibiotic use, diabetes mellitus, immunosuppression, increased estrogen levels, and use of certain contraceptive devices including intrauterine devices, diaphragms, or sponges. It is not a sexually transmitted infection. Vaginal discharge is not always present in yeast infections, but when occurring it is typically odorless, thick, white, and clumpy. Vaginal itching is the most common symptom of candida vulvovaginitis. Women may also experience burning, soreness, irritation, pain during urination, or pain during sex. The diagnosis of Candida vulvovaginitis is made by looking at a sample taken during speculum exam under the microscope that shows hyphae (yeast), or from a culture. The symptoms described above may be present in other vaginal infections, so microscopic diagnosis or culture is needed to confirm the diagnosis. Treatment is with intra-vaginal or oral anti-fungal medications.

=== Trichomonas vaginitis ===
Trichomonas vaginitis is an infection acquired through sex that is associated with vaginal discharge. It can be transmitted by way of the penis to the vagina, the vagina to the penis, or from vagina to vagina. The discharge in Trichomonas is typically yellowish-green in color. It sometimes is frothy and can have a foul smell. Other symptoms may include vaginal burning or itching, pain with urination, or pain with sexual intercourse. Trichomonas is diagnosed by looking at a sample of discharge under the microscope showing trichomonads moving on the slide. However, in women with trichomonas the organism is typically detected in only 60-80% of cases. Other testing, including a culture of the discharge or a PCR assay, are more likely to detect the organism. Treatment is with a one time dose of oral antibiotics, most commonly metronidazole or tinidazole.

=== Chlamydia and gonorrhea ===
Chlamydia and gonorrhea can also cause vaginal discharge, though more often than not these infections do not cause symptoms. The vaginal discharge in chlamydia is typically pus-filled, but in around 80% of cases chlamydia does not cause any discharge. Gonorrhea can also cause pus-filled vaginal discharge, but gonorrhea is similarly asymptomatic in up to 50% of cases. If the vaginal discharge is accompanied by pelvic pain, this is suggestive of pelvic inflammatory disease (PID), a condition in which the bacteria have moved up the reproductive tract.

=== Other causes ===
Foreign objects can cause a chronic vaginal discharge with a foul odor. Common foreign objects found in adolescents and adults are tampons, toilet paper, and objects used for sexual arousal.

=== Before puberty ===
The most common reason pre-pubertal females go to the gynecologist is concern about vaginal discharge and vaginal odor. The causes of abnormal vaginal discharge in pre-pubertal girls are different than in adults and are usually related to lifestyle factors such as irritation from harsh soaps or tight clothing. The vagina of pre-pubertal girls (due to lack of estrogen) is thin-walled and has a different microbiota; additionally, the vulva in pre-pubertal girls lacks pubic hair. These features makes the vagina more prone to bacterial infection. The bacteria that are more commonly responsible for vaginal discharge in pre-pubertal girls are distinct from those in other age groups, and include Bacteroides, Peptostreptococcus, and Candida (yeast). These can derive from the colonization of the vagina with oral or fecal bacteria. Another cause of vaginal discharge in pre-pubertal girls is the presence of a foreign object such as a toy or a piece of toilet paper. In the case of a foreign body, the discharge is often bloody or brown.

== See also ==
- Bartholin's gland
- Cervical mucorrhea
- Vaginal flora
- Vaginal lubrication
- Vaginal microbiota in pregnancy
