= Thales de Lema =

Brazilian scientist (1928–2020)

- Born: 6 February 1928
- Died: 10 October 2020
- Education: Federal University of Rio Grande do Sul; Pontifical Catholic University of Rio Grande do Sul
- Known for: Taxonomy and biogeography of Neotropical snakes
- Scientific career
- Fields: Herpetology, Zoology, Biology
- Workplaces: Pontifical Catholic University of Rio Grande do Sul
- Doctoral advisor: Wolfgang Bücherl

Thales de Lema (6 February 1928 – 10 October 2020) was a Brazilian herpetologist, biologist, and university professor.

== Biography ==
De Lema developed an interest in nature during his childhood. In 1957, he earned a bachelor's degree (Bacharelado) in natural history from the Federal University of Rio Grande do Sul (UFRGS). He completed an internship in medical zoology at the Oswaldo Cruz Foundation in 1956 and obtained a licentiate degree (Licenciada) in biology, natural sciences, and mathematics from the Pontifical Catholic University of Rio Grande do Sul (PUCRS) in 1958. He began teaching at PUCRS in 1959.

In 1968, he specialized in herpetology at the Museum of Zoology of the University of São Paulo, and in 1975 at the Butantan Institute of the São Paulo State Health Department. In 1977, he received his doctorate in natural history from PUCRS under the supervision of Wolfgang Bücherl. His dissertation, titled Estudo monográfico de Elapomorphus lemniscatus Duméril, Bibron et Duméril, 1854, com o estudo de sua variação geográfica (Ophidia, Caenophidia, Colubridae, Colubrinae), addressed speciation in fossorial snakes. From 1977 until his retirement in 2008, De Lema served as a professor at PUCRS. His academic activities included supervising undergraduate and doctoral theses, coordinating environmental impact assessment projects, and conducting research in herpetology (taxonomy, systematics, and biogeography), mariculture, ecology, parasitology, statistics, and anatomy. In 1993, he completed postdoctoral training at the Royal Ontario Museum and the University of Toronto in Toronto, Ontario, Canada, specializing in genetics and molecular biology.

De Lema’s zoological research focused primarily on the taxonomy of extant snakes. His main research interests included biogeography and speciation, particularly among fossorial snakes of the tribe Elapomorphini. He also conducted studies on polyploidy in salamanders from northern Canada, the Chinese giant salamander, and racer snakes of the genus Masticophis from the Nearctic region. His bibliography comprises more than 300 scientific articles, as well as the book Os répteis do Rio Grande do Sul: atuais e fósseis, biogeografia, ofidismo (2002), which contributed significantly to the understanding of Neotropical snake diversity. He also published research on fishes.

In 1955, together with Ludwig Buckup and the Jesuit priest Balduíno Rambo, he founded the Museu de Ciências Naturais do Rio Grande do Sul in Porto Alegre, which originated from the dissolved natural history collection of the Júlio de Castilhos Museum. He was also a senior scientific researcher at the Zoobotanical Foundation of Rio Grande do Sul (FZRGS), affiliated with the state environmental department, which existed from 1972 until its dissolution in 2020. He also coordinated the Laboratory of Herpetology at the Museum of Science and Technology of PUCRS.

== Eponyms ==
In 2005, Paulo Passos, Ronaldo Fernandes, and Noeli Zanella named the snake species Atractus thalesdelemai in his honor.

== Taxa described ==
- Adelphostigma quadriocellata (Santos, Di-Bernardo & De Lema, 2008)
- Apostolepis albicollaris De Lema, 2002
- Apostolepis christineae De Lema, 2002
- Apostolepis kikoi Santos et al., 2018
- Apostolepis nelsonjorgei De Lema & Renner, 2004
- Apostolepis serrana De Lema & Renner, 2006
- Apostolepis striata De Lema, 2004
- Apostolepis underwoodi De Lema & Campbell, 2017
- Calamodontophis ronaldoi Franco, de Carvalho-Cintra & De Lema, 2006
- Contomastix vacariensis Feltrim & De Lema, 2000
- Phalotris labiomaculatus De Lema, 2002
- Phalotris matogrossensis De Lema, D’Agostini & Cappellari, 2005
