= Dumeril's diadem snake =

There are three species of snake named Dumeril's diadem snake:

- Phalotris lemniscatus
- Phalotris bilineatus
- Phalotris suspectus
