= Leukorrhea =

Type of vaginal discharge

- Other names: Fluor albus, Whites
- Specialty: Gynaecology

Leukorrhea or (leucorrhoea British English), also known as fluor albus, is a thick, whitish, yellowish or greenish vaginal discharge. It has also been referred to as "the whites". There are many causes of leukorrhea, the usual one being estrogen imbalance. The amount of discharge may increase due to vaginal infection, and it may disappear and reappear from time to time. This discharge can keep occurring for years, in which case it becomes more yellow and strong-smelling. It is usually a non-pathological symptom secondary to inflammatory conditions of the vagina or cervix.

Leukorrhea can be confirmed by finding >10 WBC per high-power field under a microscope when examining vaginal fluid.

Vaginal discharge is normal, and causes of change in discharge include infection, malignancy, and hormonal changes. It sometimes occurs before an adolescent female has her first period, and is considered a sign of puberty.

== Etymology ==
The word leukorrhea comes from Greek λευκός (leukós, “white”) + ῥοία (rhoía, “flow, flux”). In Latin leukorrhea is fluor albus (fluor, "flow" & albus, "white").

== Types ==
=== Physiologic leukorrhea ===
Leukorrhea can be a natural defense mechanism that the vagina uses to maintain its chemical balance, as well as to preserve the flexibility of the vaginal tissue. The term "physiologic leukorrhea" is used to refer to leukorrhea due to estrogen stimulation.

Leukorrhea may occur normally during pregnancy. This is caused by increased bloodflow to the vagina due to increased estrogen. Female infants may have leukorrhea for a short time after birth due to their in-uterine exposure to estrogen.

=== Inflammatory leukorrhea ===
It may also result from inflammation or congestion of the vaginal mucosa. In cases where it is yellowish or gives off an odor, a doctor should be consulted since it could be a sign of several disease processes, including an organic bacterial infection (aerobic vaginitis) or STD.

After delivery, leukorrhea accompanied by backache and foul-smelling lochia (post-partum vaginal discharge, containing blood, mucus, and placental tissue) may suggest the failure of involution (the uterus returning to pre-pregnancy size) due to infection. A number of investigation such as wet smear, Gram stain, culture, pap smear and biopsy are suggested to diagnose the condition.

=== Parasitic leukorrhea ===
Leukorrhea is also caused by trichomonads, a group of parasitic protozoan, specifically Trichomonas vaginalis. Common symptoms of this disease are burning sensation, itching and discharge of frothy substance, thick, white or yellow mucous.

== Treatment ==
Leukorrhea may be caused by sexually transmitted diseases; therefore, treating the STD will help treat the leukorrhea.

Treatment may include antibiotics, such as metronidazole. Other antibiotics common for the treatment of STIs include clindamycin or tinidazole.
