= Mato Grosso burrowing snake =

There are two species of snake named Mato Grosso burrowing snake:

- Apostolepis intermedia
- Phalotris matogrossensis
