= Sand dunes blackhead =

There are two species of snake named sand dunes blackhead:

- Apostolepis arenaria
- Apostolepis gaboi
