= LPHS =

LPHS may refer to:

== High schools ==
=== United States ===
- Lake Park High School, Medinah, Illinois
- LaPorte High School (Indiana), La Porte, Indiana
- LaSalle-Peru High School, La Salle, Illinois
- Lake Park High School, Roselle, Illinois
- Las Plumas High School, Oroville, California
- Lewis-Palmer High School, Monument, Colorado
- Lincoln Park High School (Chicago, Illinois)
- Lincoln Park High School (Lincoln Park, Michigan)
- Lone Peak High School, Highland, Utah
- La Plata High School, La Plata, Maryland

=== Other countries ===
- Lindsay Place High School, Pointe-Claire, Quebec

== Medicine ==
- Loin pain hematuria syndrome
