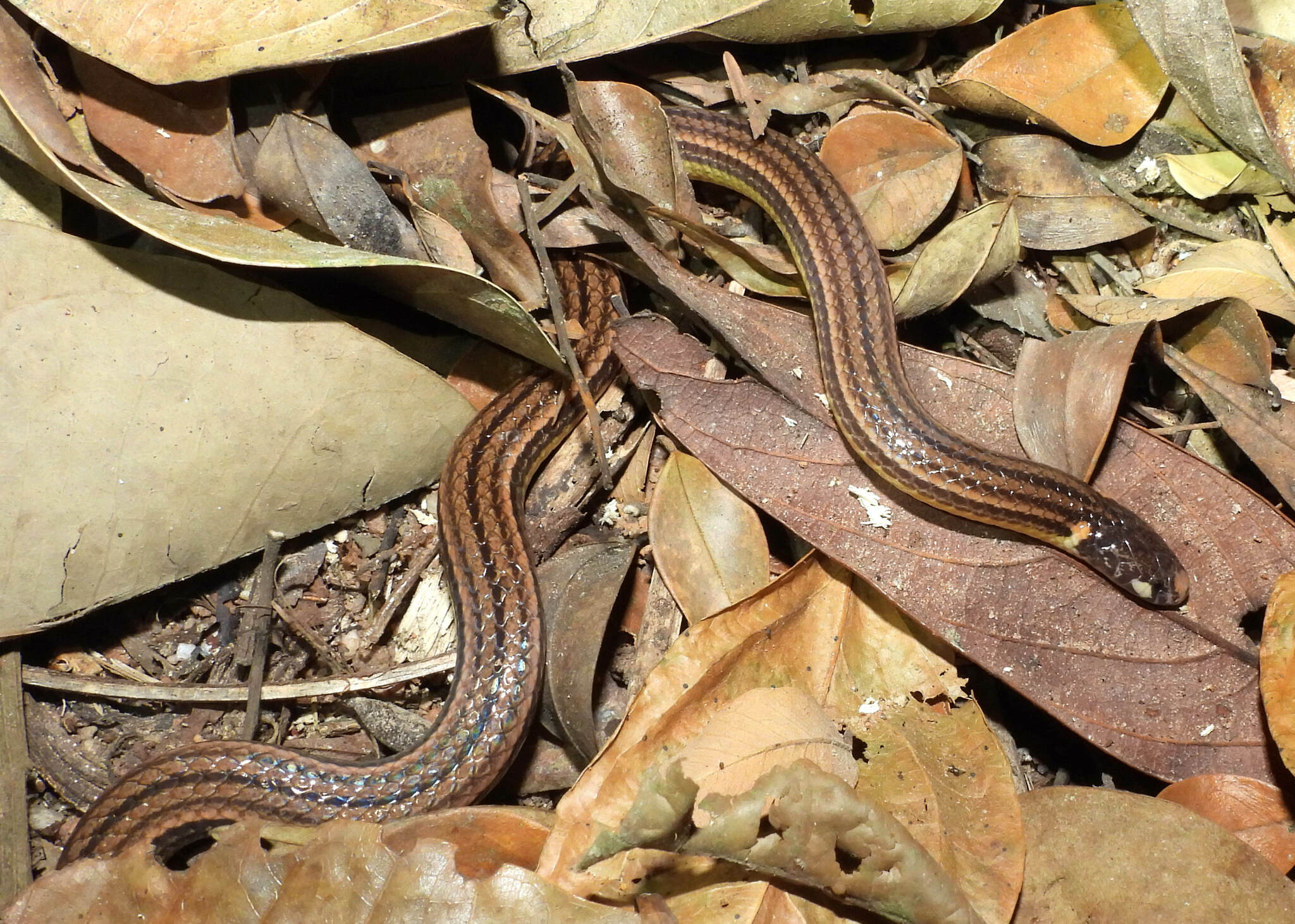

Conservation status
- Least Concern (IUCN 3.1)

Scientific classification
- Kingdom: Animalia
- Phylum: Chordata
- Class: Reptilia
- Order: Squamata
- Suborder: Serpentes
- Family: Colubridae
- Genus: Apostolepis
- Species: A. nigrolineata

Binomial name
- Apostolepis nigrolineata (Peters, 1869)

Synonyms
- Apostolepis coronata Amaral, 1929; Apostolepis quinquelineata Boulenger, 1896; Apostolepis rondoni Amaral, 1925; Apostolepis flavotorquata Lema, 2002; Elapomorphus nigrolineatus Peters, 1869

= Apostolepis nigrolineata =

Species of snake

Apostolepis nigrolineata, commonly known as the Pará blackhead or Guyana burrowing snake, is a species of snake in the family Colubridae. It is found in Brazil.

== Description ==
Apostolepis nigrolineata typically averages 165 mm (6.4 inches) in length.
