= Calamodontophis =

Scientific classification
- Kingdom: Animalia
- Phylum: Chordata
- Class: Reptilia
- Order: Squamata
- Suborder: Serpentes
- Family: Colubridae
- Subfamily: Dipsadinae
- Genus: Calamodontophis; Amaral, 1963

Genus of snakes

Calamodontophis is a genus of snakes in the family Colubridae. The genus is endemic to South America.

== Geographic range ==
Species in the genus Calamodontophis are found in Brazil and Uruguay.

== Species ==
The genus Calamodontophis contains the following species:

- Calamodontophis paucidens (Amaral, 1936)
- Calamodontophis ronaldoi Franco, de Carvalho Cintra & de Lema, 2006

Nota bene: A binomial authority in parentheses indicates that the species was originally described in a genus other than Calamodontophis.
