= Thin basement membrane disease =

- Other names: thin basement membrane disease; thin basement membrane nephropathy; thin membrane nephropathy; benign familial hematuria; TBMD; TBMN; TMN; BFH
- Specialty: Nephrology

Thin basement membrane disease (previously referred to as "benign familial hematuria") is, along with IgA nephropathy, the most common cause of hematuria without other symptoms. The only abnormal finding in this disease is a thinning of the basement membrane of the glomeruli in the kidneys. Its importance lies in the fact that it has a benign prognosis, with patients maintaining a normal kidney function throughout their lives.

== Signs and symptoms ==
Most patients with thin basement membrane disease are incidentally discovered to have microscopic hematuria on urinalysis. The blood pressure, kidney function, and the urinary protein excretion are usually normal. Mild proteinuria (less than 1.5 g/day) and hypertension are seen in a small minority of patients. Frank hematuria and loin pain should prompt a search for another cause, such as kidney stones or loin pain-hematuria syndrome. Also, there are no systemic manifestations, so presence of hearing impairment or visual impairment should prompt a search for hereditary nephritis such as Alport syndrome.

== Genetics ==
The molecular basis for thin basement membrane disease has yet to be elucidated fully; however, defects in type IV collagen have been reported in some families.

Some individuals with TBMD are thought to be carriers for genes that cause Alport syndrome.

== Diagnosis ==
Thin basement membrane disease must be differentiated from the other two common causes of glomerular hematuria, IgA nephropathy and Alport syndrome. The history and presentation are helpful in this regard:

- In Alport syndrome, there is often a family history of kidney failure, which may be associated with hearing impairment. Also, males tend to be more affected as Alport syndrome is X-linked in most cases.
- In IgA nephropathy, episodes of frank hematuria are more common, and a family history is less common.

A kidney biopsy is the most common way to diagnose thin basement membrane disease. It reveals thinning of the glomerular basement membrane from the normal 300 to 400 nanometers (nm) to 150 to 250 nm. However, a biopsy is rarely done in cases where the patient has isolated microscopic hematuria, normal kidney function, and no proteinuria. The prognosis is excellent in this setting unless the clinical manifestations progress, as occurs in most males and some females with Alport syndrome and many patients with IgA nephropathy.

== Treatment ==
Most patients with thin basement membrane disease need only reassurance. Indeed, this disease was previously referred to as "benign familial hematuria" because of its usually benign course. Angiotensin converting enzyme inhibitors have been suggested to reduce the episodes of hematuria, though controlled studies are lacking. Treating co-existing hypercalciuria and hyperuricosuria will also be helpful in reducing hematuria.

The molecular basis for thin basement membrane disease has yet to be elucidated fully; however, defects in the gene encoding the a4 chain of type IV collagen have been reported in some families.

== Prognosis ==
Overall, most people with thin basement membrane disease have an excellent prognosis. Some reports, however, suggest that a minority might develop hypertension.

Thin basement membrane disease may co-exist with other kidney diseases, which may in part be explained by the high prevalence of thin basement membrane disease.
