= Adelphostigma =

Scientific classification
- Kingdom: Animalia
- Phylum: Chordata
- Class: Reptilia
- Order: Squamata
- Suborder: Serpentes
- Family: Colubridae
- Subfamily: Dipsadinae
- Genus: Adelphostigma; Abegg, Santos-Jr, Costa, Battilana, Graboski, Vianna, Azevedo, Fagundes, Castille, Prado, Bonatto, Zaher, & Grazziotin, 2022

Genus of snakes

Adelphostigma is a genus of snakes of the family Colubridae.

== Species ==
- Adelphostigma occipitalis (Jan, 1863)
- Adelphostigma quadriocellata Santos, Di-Bernardo & de Lema, 2008
