= Apostolepis longicaudata =

Conservation status
- Least Concern (IUCN 3.1)

Scientific classification
- Kingdom: Animalia
- Phylum: Chordata
- Class: Reptilia
- Order: Squamata
- Suborder: Serpentes
- Family: Colubridae
- Genus: Apostolepis
- Species: A. longicaudata

Binomial name
- Apostolepis longicaudata Gomes, 1921

Species of snake

Apostolepis longicaudata, commonly known as the Piauí blackhead or the longhead burrowing snake, is a species of snake in the family Colubridae. It is endemic to Brazil.
