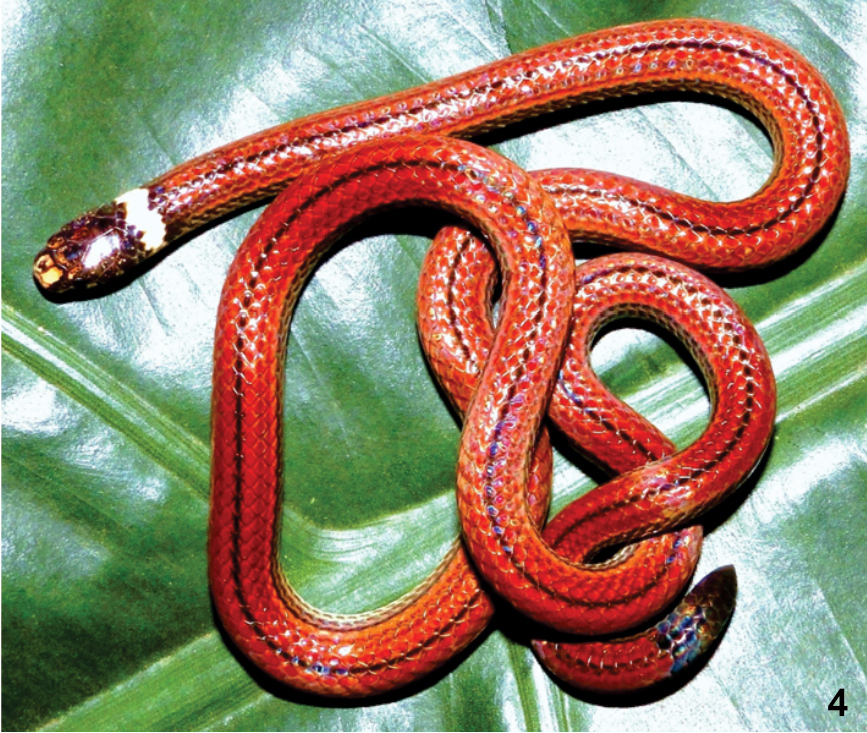
- Dorsal view

Conservation status
- Least Concern (IUCN 3.1)

Scientific classification
- Kingdom: Animalia
- Phylum: Chordata
- Class: Reptilia
- Order: Squamata
- Suborder: Serpentes
- Family: Colubridae
- Genus: Apostolepis
- Species: A. nigroterminata

Binomial name
- Apostolepis nigroterminata Boulenger, 1896

= Apostolepis nigroterminata =

Species of snake

Apostolepis nigroterminata, commonly known as the Peru blackhead or the Peru burrowing snake, is a species of snake in the family Colubridae. It is found in Peru, Brazil, and Bolivia.
