= Apostolepis phillipsae =

Conservation status
- Vulnerable (IUCN 3.1)

Scientific classification
- Kingdom: Animalia
- Phylum: Chordata
- Class: Reptilia
- Order: Squamata
- Suborder: Serpentes
- Family: Colubridae
- Genus: Apostolepis
- Species: A. phillipsae

Binomial name
- Apostolepis phillipsae Harvey, 1999

Species of snake

Apostolepis phillipsae, commonly known as Phillips's blackhead, is a species of snake in the family Colubridae. It is found in Bolivia and Brazil.
