= Calamodontophis paucidens =

Conservation status
- Endangered (IUCN 3.1)

Scientific classification
- Kingdom: Animalia
- Phylum: Chordata
- Class: Reptilia
- Order: Squamata
- Suborder: Serpentes
- Family: Colubridae
- Genus: Calamodontophis
- Species: C. paucidens

Binomial name
- Calamodontophis paucidens (Amaral, 1936)

Synonyms
- Calamodon paucidens Amaral, 1936; Calamodontophis paucidens Amaral, 1963

Species of snake

Calamodontophis paucidens, the tropical forest snake, is a species of snakes in the family Colubridae. The species is endemic to South America.

== Geographic range ==
C. paucidens is found in Brazil and Uruguay.

== Habitat ==
The natural habitat of C. paucidens is subtropical or tropical dry lowland grassland.

== Conservation status ==
C. paucidens is threatened by habitat loss.
