= Calamodontophis ronaldoi =

Conservation status
- Endangered (IUCN 2.3)

Scientific classification
- Kingdom: Animalia
- Phylum: Chordata
- Class: Reptilia
- Order: Squamata
- Suborder: Serpentes
- Family: Colubridae
- Genus: Calamodontophis
- Species: C. ronaldoi

Binomial name
- Calamodontophis ronaldoi Franco, de Carvalho Cintra & de Lema, 2006

Species of snake

Calamodontophis ronaldoi is a species of snake in the family Colubridae. The species is endemic to southern Brazil.

== Etymology ==
The specific name, ronaldoi, is in honor of Brazilian herpetologist Ronaldo Fernandes (born 1966).

== Geographic range ==
C. ronaldoi is found in the Brazilian state of Paraná.

== Description ==
C. ronaldi may be identified by distinctive markings on the head and body. On the head, it has a black comma-shaped blotch which extends from the corner of the mouth to the gular scales, and a separate oval black blotch on the parietals. On the body, it has a light-colored longitudinal dorsal line.

== Reproduction ==
C. ronaldi is viviparous.
