= Apostolepis niceforoi =

Conservation status
- Data Deficient (IUCN 3.1)

Scientific classification
- Kingdom: Animalia
- Phylum: Chordata
- Class: Reptilia
- Order: Squamata
- Suborder: Serpentes
- Family: Colubridae
- Genus: Apostolepis
- Species: A. niceforoi

Binomial name
- Apostolepis niceforoi Amaral, 1935

Species of snake

Apostolepis niceforoi, also commonly known as the Amazon burrowing snake and the Colombian blackhead, is a species of snake in the subfamily Dipsadinae of the family Colubridae. The species is endemic to Colombia.

== Etymology ==
The specific name, niceforoi, is in honor of missionary Brother Nicéforo María, born Antoine Rouhaire in France, who established a natural history museum in Medellín, Colombia.

== Description ==
Apostolepis niceforoi has the following scalation. There is a single preocular which contacts the nasal. There is no loreal. There are six upper labials, the second and third contacting the eye. There are six lower labials, the first four contacting the chin shields. The dorsal scales are smooth, without apical pits, and arranged in 15 rows throughout the length of the body. There are 246–248 ventrals, and 21–23 pairs of subcaudals.

Dorsally, Apostolepis niceforoi is light yellowish brown, with seven dark brown stripes. Ventrally, it is uniformly yellow.

== Geographic distribution ==
Apostolepis niceforoi is found in extreme southern Colombia, in Amazonas Department.

== Habitat ==
The preferred natural habitat of Apostolepis niceforoi is forest.

== Behavior ==
Apostolepis niceforoi is terrestrial and fossorial.

== Reproduction ==
Apostolepis niceforoi is oviparous.
