= Apostolepis multicincta =

Conservation status
- Least Concern (IUCN 3.1)

Scientific classification
- Kingdom: Animalia
- Phylum: Chordata
- Class: Reptilia
- Order: Squamata
- Suborder: Serpentes
- Family: Colubridae
- Genus: Apostolepis
- Species: A. multicincta

Binomial name
- Apostolepis multicincta Harvey, 1999

Species of snake

Apostolepis multicincta, commonly known as Harvey's blackhead, is a species of snake in the family Colubridae. It is endemic to Bolivia.
