= Phalotris illustrator =

Scientific classification
- Kingdom: Animalia
- Phylum: Chordata
- Class: Reptilia
- Order: Squamata
- Suborder: Serpentes
- Family: Colubridae
- Genus: Phalotris
- Species: P. illustrator

Binomial name
- Phalotris illustrator Scrocchi, Giraudo, & Nenda, 2022

Species of snake

Phalotris illustrator is a species of snake in the family Colubridae. The species is native to Argentina.
