= Phalotris normanscotti =

Scientific classification
- Kingdom: Animalia
- Phylum: Chordata
- Class: Reptilia
- Order: Squamata
- Suborder: Serpentes
- Family: Colubridae
- Genus: Phalotris
- Species: P. normanscotti

Binomial name
- Phalotris normanscotti Cabral & Cacciali, 2015

Species of snake

Phalotris normanscotti, the Chaco burrowing snake, is a species of snake in the family Colubridae. The species is native to Paraguay.
