= Apostolepis goiasensis =

Conservation status
- Data Deficient (IUCN 3.1)

Scientific classification
- Kingdom: Animalia
- Phylum: Chordata
- Class: Reptilia
- Order: Squamata
- Suborder: Serpentes
- Family: Colubridae
- Genus: Apostolepis
- Species: A. goiasensis

Binomial name
- Apostolepis goiasensis Prado, 1942

Species of snake

Apostolepis goiasensis, commonly known as Prado's blackhead or the Goias burrowing snake, is a species of snake in the family Colubridae. It is endemic to Brazil.

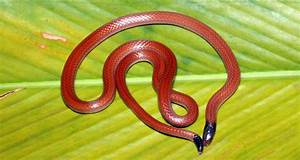
Apostolepis goiasensis
