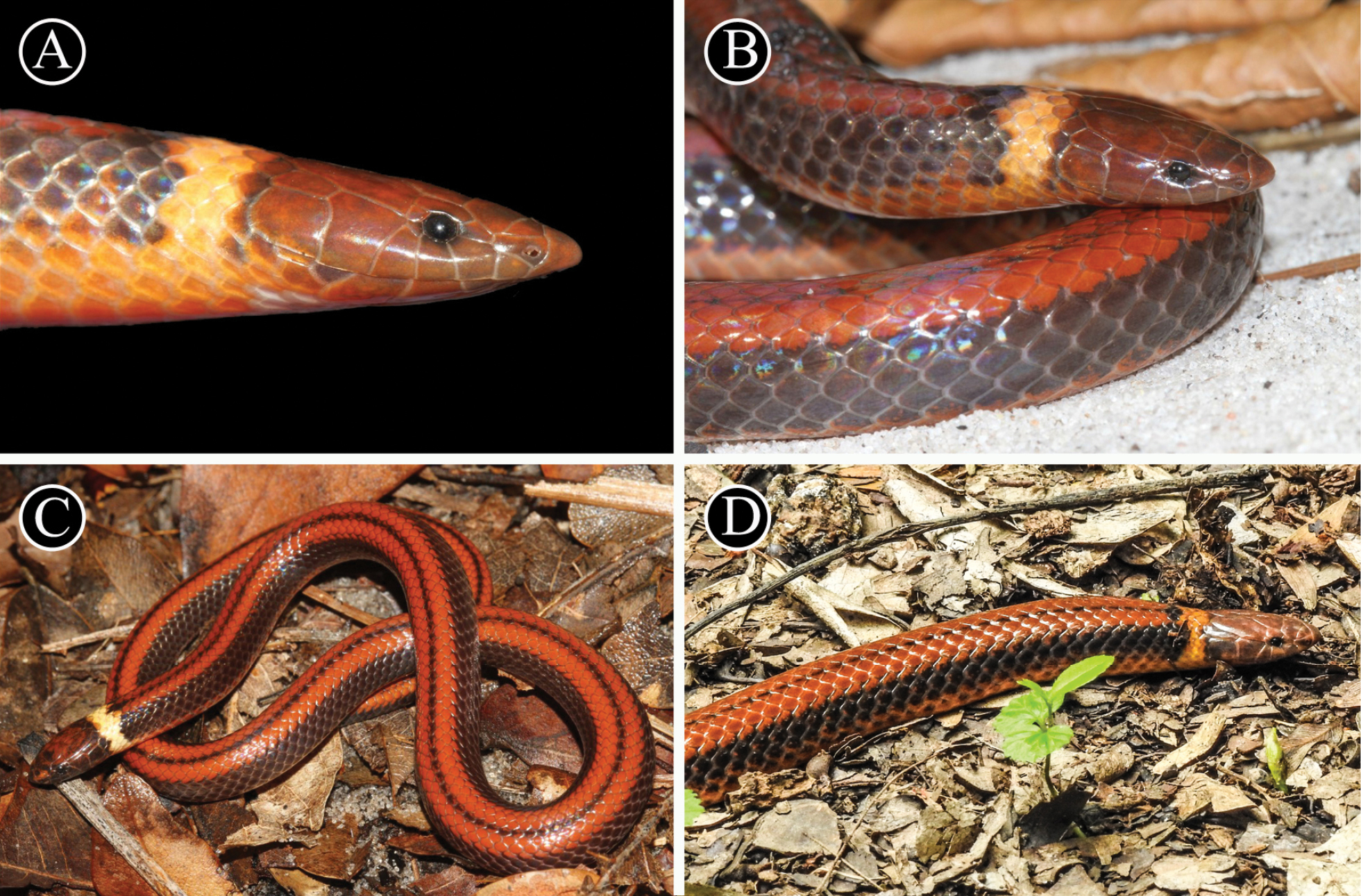

Scientific classification
- Kingdom: Animalia
- Phylum: Chordata
- Class: Reptilia
- Order: Squamata
- Suborder: Serpentes
- Family: Colubridae
- Genus: Phalotris
- Species: P. shawnella

Binomial name
- Phalotris shawnella Smith, Brouard, & Cacciali, 2022

= Phalotris shawnella =

Species of snake

Phalotris shawnella is a species of snake in the family Colubridae. Formally described in 2022, it is named after Shawn Ariel Smith Fernández and Ella Bethany Atkinson, two children known to the authors describing the species. It has a brick-red head with a broad yellow dorsal collar where it meets the body. The body is brick-red dorsally and red-orange ventrally, with broad, black to brownish-black lines along the sides running the length of the body. It is endemic to Paraguay, where it is known from San Pedro department. It is known from cerradón forest, where it has been collected from sandy soil near a lake and in leaf litter.

== Taxonomy ==
Phalotris shawnella was formally described in 2022 based on an adult male specimen collected from Laguna Blanca Ranch in the San Pedro department of Paraguay. The species is named after Shawn Ariel Smith Fernández and Ella Bethany Atkinson, two children known to the authors describing the species. Within the genus, it is placed in the nasutus species group.

== Description ==
Phalotris shawnella has a brick-red head dorsally and uniformly brownish-red supralabials. The underside of the head is red-orange, with a grey hue to the first three infralabials and whitish chin shields. Behind the head, there is a broad yellow collar on the dorsum, with the collar fading towards the side to be replaced by a thinner black collar. Both collars are absent on the underside. The body is brick-red dorsally, with a faint thin black vertebral line along its length that fades upon reaching the tail. There are broad, black to brownish-black lines along the sides along the length of the body, from the collar to the tip of the tail. These bands are uniformly 3–3.5 scales wide on the body, narrowing slightly to 2 scales wide on the tail. The underside of the body is red-orange, with small black, diffuse blotches on the edges of some of the ventral scales.

Phalotris shawnella can be distinguished from all species in its genus outside the nasutus group by its pointed snout with a prominent rostral shield and the fusion of the second and third temporal plates. It can be differentiated from other species in the group by several characters: it has the fifth supralabial scale in contact with the parietal scale, a vertebral stripe, a yellowish nuchal collar, broad dark lateral bands, lightly black-spotted red-orange ventral scales, and a bilobed, extremely asymmetrical hemipenis.

== Distribution and habitat ==
Phalotris shawnella is endemic to Paraguay, where it is known from San Pedro department. It is known from cerradón forest in sandy soil, near disturbed cerrado along a lake. It has also been observed hiding in leaf litter in cerradón forest. It is known to feed on Vanzosaura rubricauda.
