= Apostolepis adhara =

Scientific classification
- Kingdom: Animalia
- Phylum: Chordata
- Class: Reptilia
- Order: Squamata
- Suborder: Serpentes
- Family: Colubridae
- Genus: Apostolepis
- Species: A. adhara

Binomial name
- Apostolepis adhara Franca, Barbo, Silva-Junior, Silva, & Zaher, 2018

Species of snake

Apostolepis adhara (common name: São Salvador burrow-snake) is a species of snake in the family Colubridae. It is endemic to Brazil.
