= Apostolepis ambiniger =

Conservation status
- Data Deficient (IUCN 3.1)

Scientific classification
- Kingdom: Animalia
- Phylum: Chordata
- Class: Reptilia
- Order: Squamata
- Suborder: Serpentes
- Family: Colubridae
- Genus: Apostolepis
- Species: A. ambiniger

Binomial name
- Apostolepis ambiniger (Peters, 1869)

Species of snake

Apostolepis ambiniger, the Paraguayan blackhead, is a species of snake in the family Colubridae. It is found in Brazil, Bolivia, and Paraguay.
