= Apostolepis nelsonjorgei =

Conservation status
- Least Concern (IUCN 3.1)

Scientific classification
- Kingdom: Animalia
- Phylum: Chordata
- Class: Reptilia
- Order: Squamata
- Suborder: Serpentes
- Family: Colubridae
- Genus: Apostolepis
- Species: A. nelsonjorgei

Binomial name
- Apostolepis nelsonjorgei de Lema & Renner, 2004

Species of snake

Apostolepis nelsonjorgei, also known commonly as cobrinha-da-terra (little ground snake) in Brazilian Portuguese, is a species of snake in the subfamily Dipsadinae of the family Colubridae. The species is endemic to Brazil.

== Etymology ==
The specific name, nelsonjorgei, is in honor of Brazilian herpetologist Nelson Jorge da Silva Jr.

== Geographic distribution ==
Apostolepis nelsonjorgei is found in central Brazil, in the Brazilian states of Goiás and Tocantins.

== Habitat ==
The preferred natural habitat of Apostolepis nelsonjorgei is savanna.

== Behavior ==
Apostolepis nelsonjorgei is terrestrial.

== Reproduction ==
Apostolepis nelsonjorgei is oviparous.
