= Apostolepis lineata =

Conservation status
- Data Deficient (IUCN 3.1)

Scientific classification
- Kingdom: Animalia
- Phylum: Chordata
- Class: Reptilia
- Order: Squamata
- Suborder: Serpentes
- Family: Colubridae
- Genus: Apostolepis
- Species: A. lineata

Binomial name
- Apostolepis lineata Cope, 1887

Species of snake

Apostolepis lineata, commonly known as the hognose lineate blackhead, is a species of snake in the family Colubridae. It is endemic to Brazil.
