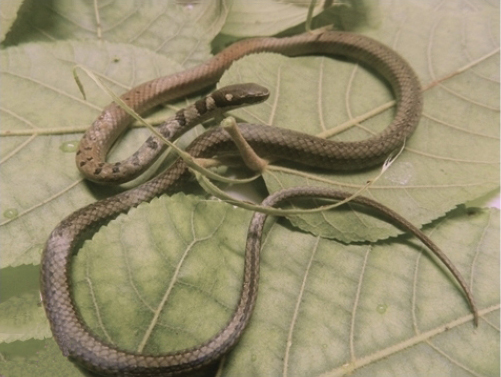

Conservation status
- Least Concern (IUCN 3.1)

Scientific classification
- Kingdom: Animalia
- Phylum: Chordata
- Class: Reptilia
- Order: Squamata
- Suborder: Serpentes
- Family: Colubridae
- Genus: Adelphostigma
- Species: A. occipitalis

Binomial name
- Adelphostigma occipitalis (Jan, 1863)

Synonyms
- Coronella elegans Günther, 1858; Enicognathus occipitalis Jan, 1863; Adelphostigma occipitalis (Jan, 1863); Taeniophallus occipitalis (Jan, 1863); Dromicus (Lygophis) wuchereri Günther, 1863; Dromicus miolepis Boettger, 1891; Liophis occipitalis Amaral, 1929; Rhadinaea occipitalis Boulenger, 1894; Echinanthera occipitalis Dibernardo, 1992

= Adelphostigma occipitalis =

Species of snake

Adelphostigma occipitalis is a species of snake in the family Colubridae. It is widely distribution in South America and occurs from northeastern Peru and Colombia south and east to large parts of Brazil, Bolivia, Paraguay, Uruguay, and northern Argentina. It is oviparous.
