= Apostolepis dorbignyi =

Conservation status
- Data Deficient (IUCN 3.1)

Scientific classification
- Kingdom: Animalia
- Phylum: Chordata
- Class: Reptilia
- Order: Squamata
- Suborder: Serpentes
- Family: Colubridae
- Genus: Apostolepis
- Species: A. dorbignyi

Binomial name
- Apostolepis dorbignyi (Schlegel, 1837)

Synonyms
- Calamaria d'orbignyi Schlegel, 1837; Apostolepis dorbignyi — Boulenger, 1896

Species of snake

Apostolepis dorbignyi, also known commonly as the Bolivian burrowing snake and Dorbigny's blackhead, is a species of snake in the family Colubridae. The species is native to western South America.

== Etymology ==
The specific name, dorbignyi, is in honor of French naturalist Alcide d'Orbigny.

== Geographic range ==
A. dorbignyi is found in Bolivia and Peru.

== Habitat ==
The preferred natural habitat of A. dorbignyi is savanna, at altitudes of about 600 m (2,000 ft).

== Description ==
A small snake, A. dorbignyi may attain a total length of about 38 cm (15 in), which includes a tail about 5 cm (2 in) long.

== Diet ==
A. dorbignyi preys predominately upon amphisbaenians and small snakes, but will also eat other organisms found in soil such as earthworms, other invertebrates, and larvae of invertebrates.

== Reproduction ==
A. dorbignyi is oviparous.
