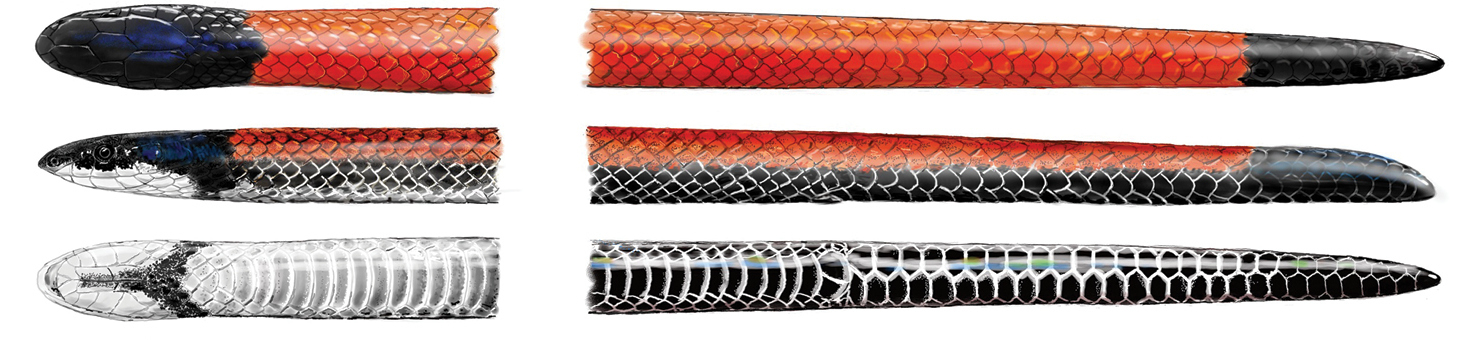

Conservation status
- Least Concern (IUCN 3.1)

Scientific classification
- Kingdom: Animalia
- Phylum: Chordata
- Class: Reptilia
- Order: Squamata
- Suborder: Serpentes
- Family: Colubridae
- Genus: Apostolepis
- Species: A. dimidiata

Binomial name
- Apostolepis dimidiata (Jan, 1862)

= Apostolepis dimidiata =

Species of snake

Apostolepis dimidiata, the common bilineate blackhead, is a species of snake in the family Colubridae. It is found in Brazil, Argentina, and Paraguay.
