= Apostolepis tenuis =

Conservation status
- Data Deficient (IUCN 3.1)

Scientific classification
- Kingdom: Animalia
- Phylum: Chordata
- Class: Reptilia
- Order: Squamata
- Suborder: Serpentes
- Family: Colubridae
- Genus: Apostolepis
- Species: A. tenuis

Binomial name
- Apostolepis tenuis Ruthven, 1927

Species of snake

Apostolepis tenuis, commonly known as the Bolivian blackhead or Ruthven's burrowing snake, is a species of snake in the family Colubridae. It is found in Bolivia and Brazil.
