= Apostolepis quirogai =

Conservation status
- Endangered (IUCN 3.1)

Scientific classification
- Kingdom: Animalia
- Phylum: Chordata
- Class: Reptilia
- Order: Squamata
- Suborder: Serpentes
- Family: Colubridae
- Genus: Apostolepis
- Species: A. quirogai

Binomial name
- Apostolepis quirogai Giraudo & Scrocchi, 1998

Species of snake

Apostolepis quirogai, commonly known as the Misiones blackhead, is a species of snake in the family Colubridae. It is found in Argentina and Brazil.
