= Reference ranges for urine tests =

Reference ranges for urine tests are described below:

Measurement	Lower limit	Upper limit	Unit
Urinary specific gravity	1.003	1.030	g/mL
Urobilinogen	0.2	1.0	Ehrlich units or mg/dL
Free catecholamines, dopamine	90	420	μg/d
Red blood cells (RBCs)	0	2 - 3	per High Power Field (HPF)
RBC casts	n/a	0 / negative	per High Power Field (HPF)
White blood cells (WBCs)	0	2	per High Power Field (HPF)
pH	5	7	(unitless)
Protein	0	trace amounts	
Glucose	n/a	0 / negative	
Ketones	n/a	0 / negative	
Bilirubin	n/a	0 / negative	
Blood	n/a	0 / negative	
Nitrite	n/a	0 / negative	
Leukocytes	n/a	0 / negative	

== See also ==
- Reference range
- Reference ranges for blood tests
