= Loin pain hematuria syndrome =

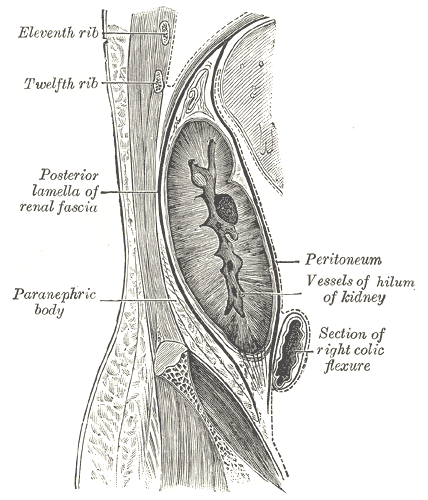
- Sagittal section of the kidney and its capsule. Pain in LPHS is thought to result from distension of the kidney capsule.
- Specialty: Urology

Loin pain hematuria syndrome (LPHS) is the combination of debilitating unilateral or bilateral flank pain and microscopic or macroscopic amounts of blood in the urine that is otherwise unexplained.

Loin pain-hematuria syndrome (LPHS) is a poorly defined disorder characterized by recurrent or persistent loin (flank) pain and hematuria that appears to represent glomerular bleeding. Most patients present with both manifestations, but some present with loin pain or hematuria alone. Pain episodes are rarely associated with low-grade fever and dysuria, but urinary tract infection is not present. The major causes of flank pain and hematuria, such as nephrolithiasis and blood clot, are typically not present. Renal arteriography may suggest focally impaired cortical perfusion, while renal biopsy may show interstitial fibrosis and arterial sclerosis.

The pain is typically severe, and narcotic therapy is often prescribed as a way to manage chronic pain. Sleep can be difficult because the supine position increases pressure on the flank. The onset of pain is often associated with nausea and vomiting, making pain management by oral opiates complicated.

== Cause ==
The cause of LPHS is not known. One theory proposes that it is caused by a thin glomerular basement membrane and red blood cell (RBC) renal tubular congestion that leads to swelling of the kidney and distension of the renal fascia resulting in pain.

Researchers have hypothesized that the syndrome may be due to blood vessel diseases of the kidney, spasms of the kidney vessels, or other bleeding disorders (coagulopathy). The hematuria in LPHS may be due to an abnormal (thick or thin) glomerular basement membrane. The glomerular basement membrane is a tissue in the kidney that filters the blood. An abnormal glomerular basement membrane may allow red blood cells into the urinary space. Because kidney stones are so common in people with LPHS, crystals in the kidney tubules may also play a part in bleeding and pain.

Other speculations on cause include

- IgA nephropathy. This is a condition in which small amount of a type of normal antibody (called IgA) get stuck in the kidney as it passes through in the bloodstream. This is a chronic condition, which sometimes goes away on its own but occasionally can cause damage to the kidneys. A related condition called IgM nephropathy can sometimes cause pain.
- Thin membrane disease. In this condition the membrane that filters the blood to make urine is too thin, and blood can pass across it in very small amounts. In a few cases of this condition, there is pain in the kidneys, usually occurring in attacks every so often. Although this condition can be painful, kidney failure does not seem to occur in the long term, so that the only real problem is the symptoms.
- Infection. In some cases, loin pain-haematuria syndrome occurs after a bladder infection with involvement of the kidney. Even when the infection has been treated and bugs can no longer be found in the urine, pain may persist for 6 months, or even longer in some cases.
- "Classic loin pain-haematuria syndrome". Some patients have none of the above diagnoses. In these cases there may be minor abnormalities on a kidney biopsy. Angiogram tests to look at the blood vessels in the kidney may show abnormal blood flow, perhaps causing a cramp like pain. The cause is not fully understood. It certainly is [more common] in women than in men, and there may be hormonal influences. Some women find the pain is worse at different times of their menstrual cycle, or comes on during pregnancy, or if they are taking [oral contraceptives].

It has also been reported to be caused by microscopic granules of calcium oxylate into the glomerulus itself, causing blood vessels to rupture and increase the distention of the renal capsule.

This condition may persist for some years, and can be lifelong. Damage to the kidneys leading to kidney failure does not occur. However, because LPHS is unusual in patients older than 60 years, some clinicians believe that LPHS eventually resolves.

At this time no cure has been found for this disease. LPHS is a debilitating disease due to chronic pain and the inability to know how to control the glomerular aspect. The pain of LPHS can be worsened by acts as simple as riding in the car and undertaking daily activities. Many people with this disease are unable to maintain employment due to the debilitating pain. Unpublished research by Dr. Ahmed Ghanem (who has cared for well over 100 women with LPHS found that untreated Symptomatic Nephroptosis - SN (Hypermobile kidney) can lead to LPHS. Nephropexy can help to relieve symptoms. Severe renal colic caused by kinking ureter. Pain classically relieved a little by going on all fours with hips higher than head.

== Diagnosis ==
- LPHS is considered a diagnosis of exclusion. The syndrome presents with hematuria (blood in the urine) and flank (a region of the lower back beneath the ribs and above the ilium) pain which can result from a number of causes. Nonglomerular causes of bleeding (e.g., urinary infection, tumor, or nephrolithiasis) must be excluded. Obstruction of the urinary tract should not be present, confirmed by at least two imaging procedures while pain is present.
- Diagnosis of loin pain-hematuria syndrome (LPHS) occurs when hematuria is present, recurrent or persistent pain is severe, and other causes of bleeding are excluded. Urine testing can be performed to detect microscopic levels of hematuria. Protein is also commonly found in the urine of patients with LPHS. Kidney biopsies are sometimes performed to look for evidence of glomerular hematuria, excess red blood cells in the kidney tubules, and to assess the width of the glomerular basement membrane.
- Hematuria (more than 5 red blood cells per high power field) should be present in virtually every urinalysis and is typically characterized by dysmorphic red cells.
- Recurrent or persistent severe pain for six months or more, occurring in the costovertebral angles.

=== Relation to chronic pelvic pain ===
LPHS has considerable overlap with chronic pelvic pain syndrome.

=== Relation to thin basement membrane disease ===
A thin glomerular basement membrane, as in thin basement membrane disease, is proposed to be the characteristic finding on renal biopsy, but not part of the syndrome definition.

=== Differential diagnosis ===
- Kidney stones
- Nutcracker syndrome
- IgA nephropathy
- Cancer of the genitourinary tract
- Chronic pelvic pain
- Endometriosis
- Pyelonephritis

== Treatment ==
The treatment of LPHS varies considerably from centre to centre. As the condition is rare and poorly understood, a widely adopted standard of care is not existent.

Treatment of loin pain-hematuria syndrome (LPHS) typically consists of pain management. Narcotics or oral opioids may be prescribed to help control pain. Patients with severe pain may need high-dose opioids daily or almost daily. Occasionally, people with LPHS require hospitalization for intravenous opioid therapy and control of nausea. Other treatments may include denervation, autotransplantation, renal neurectomy, or nephrectomy. Unfortunately symptoms often recur following these procedures. Limited evidence suggests that drugs that inhibit angiotensin may reduce the frequency and severity of episodes of loin pain and gross hematuria.

Pain management with opiate and non-opiate analgesia is common. Angiotensin converting enzyme inhibitors are thought to be beneficial, as they reduce intraglomerular pressure and, presumably, reduce renal tubular congestion with RBCs.

Possible treatment regimens

=== General ===
- Angiotensin inhibition
- Reduce the risk of nephrolithiasis

=== Pain control ===
- Opioid therapy
- Inpatient therapy
- Intravenous opioid regimen
- Antiemetic drugs
- Pruritus management
- Maintenance therapy between pain exacerbations

=== Invasive therapy ===
- Implantable drug delivery system
- Surgical renal denervation
- Renal autotransplantation
- Nephrectomy (NOT recommended)
- Other invasive therapies (but not proven effective)
  - Pulse radio frequency
  - Celiac plexus block
  - Intraureteric capsaicin infusion

Surgery (autotransplantation) is thought by some to be of benefit in selected individuals and advocated in some centres, but usually considered the last resort.

Physicians discourage surgery, as LPHS symptoms often re-occur after autotransplantation.

== Epidemiology ==
LPHS is listed as a rare disease in the US National Institute of Health Rare Diseases database. While exact numbers worldwide are not available, the primary LPHS research clinic located in Ohio has over 200 patients. In addition, several hundred other patients have been reported in one study as of 2006. The prevalence of LPHS is estimated at about 0.012 percent, which qualifies LPHS as a rare disease (prevalence less than 0.07 percent) according to the Rare Diseases Act of 2002. Those affected are usually young, with an average age of 31 years, and 70% to 80% are women.

== See also ==
- Pelvic pain
