= Apostolepis polylepis =

Conservation status
- Least Concern (IUCN 3.1)

Scientific classification
- Kingdom: Animalia
- Phylum: Chordata
- Class: Reptilia
- Order: Squamata
- Suborder: Serpentes
- Family: Colubridae
- Genus: Apostolepis
- Species: A. polylepis

Binomial name
- Apostolepis polylepis Amaral, 1922

Species of snake

Apostolepis polylepis, commonly known as the hawbeack blackhead, is a species of snake in the family Colubridae. It is endemic to Brazil.
