= Apostolepis sanctaeritae =

Scientific classification
- Domain: Eukaryota
- Kingdom: Animalia
- Phylum: Chordata
- Class: Reptilia
- Order: Squamata
- Suborder: Serpentes
- Family: Colubridae
- Genus: Apostolepis
- Species: A. sanctaeritae

Binomial name
- Apostolepis sanctaeritae Werner, 1924

Species of snake

Apostolepis sanctaeritae is a species of snake in the family Colubridae. It is endemic to Brazil.
