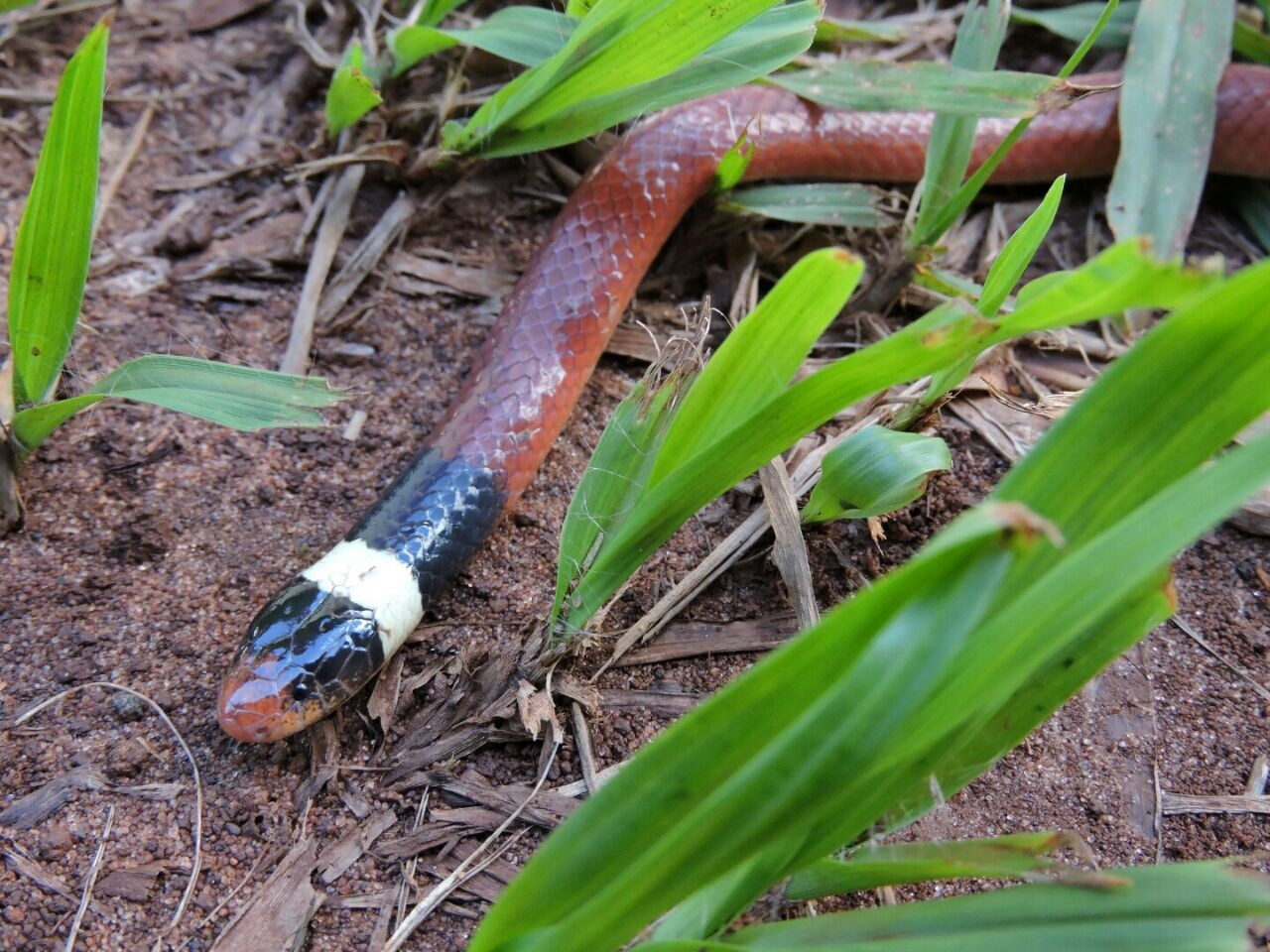
- Phalotris matogrossensis

Scientific classification
- Kingdom: Animalia
- Phylum: Chordata
- Class: Reptilia
- Order: Squamata
- Suborder: Serpentes
- Family: Colubridae
- Subfamily: Dipsadinae
- Genus: Phalotris; Cope, 1862

= Phalotris =

Genus of snakes

Phalotris is a genus of snakes in the subfamily Dipsadinae of the family Colubridae. All species of the genus Phalotris are native to South America. The specific name, mertensi, is in honor of German herpetologist Robert Mertens. The specific name, normanscotti, is in honor of Norman Scott, Jr., in recognition of his contribution to the knowledge of the herpetofauna of Paraguay.

== Venom ==
The venom of the genus Phalotris was poorly characterized, due to the low amount produced by snakes of the family Colubridae. A more detailed characterization of particularly interesting proteins could only be viable by obtaining recombinant proteins. However, there is a report of an incident of snakebite by a Phalotris, which resulted in headache, local and oral mucosa hemorrhage, edema, and renal failure. Another incident report occurred with a 37-year-old biologist, whose symptoms were immediate local pain, bleeding, and edema. A few hours later, there was headache, systemic hemorrhage, fever, myalgia, and dark urine. A study of the venom of Phalotris mertensi showed a myotoxic action three times greater than Bothrops jararaca.

== Species ==
The following 19 species are recognized as being valid.

- Phalotris bilineatus (A.M.C. Duméril, Bibron & A.H.A. Duméril, 1854) – Dumeril's diadem snake
- Phalotris concolor Ferrarezzi, 1993
- Phalotris cuyanus (Cei, 1984)
- Phalotris illustrator Scrocchi, Giraudo & Nenda, 2022
- Phalotris labiomaculatus de Lema, 2002
- Phalotris lativittatus Ferrarezzi, 1993
- Phalotris lemniscatus (A.M.C. Duméril, Bibron & A.H.A. Duméril, 1854) – Duméril's diadem snake, Pampeana black headed snake
- Phalotris matogrossensis de Lema, D'Agostini & Cappellari, 2005 – Mato Grosso burrowing snake
- Phalotris mertensi (Hoge, 1955)
- Phalotris multipunctatus Puorto & Ferrarezzi, 1993
- Phalotris nasutus (Gomes, 1915)
- Phalotris nigrilatus Ferrarezzi, 1993
- Phalotris normanscotti Cabral & Cacciali, 2015 – Chaco burrowing snake
- Phalotris reticulatus (W. Peters, 1860)
- Phalotris sansebastiani Jansen & G. Köhler, 2008
- Phalotris shawnella P. Smith, Brouard & Cacciali, 2022
- Phalotris spegazzinii (Boulenger, 1913)
- Phalotris suspectus (Amaral, 1924) – Dumeril's diadem snake
- Phalotris tricolor (A.M.C. Duméril, Bibron & A.H.A. Duméril, 1854) – tricolored burrowing snake

Nota bene: A binomial authority in parentheses indicates that the species was originally described in a genus other than Phalotris.
