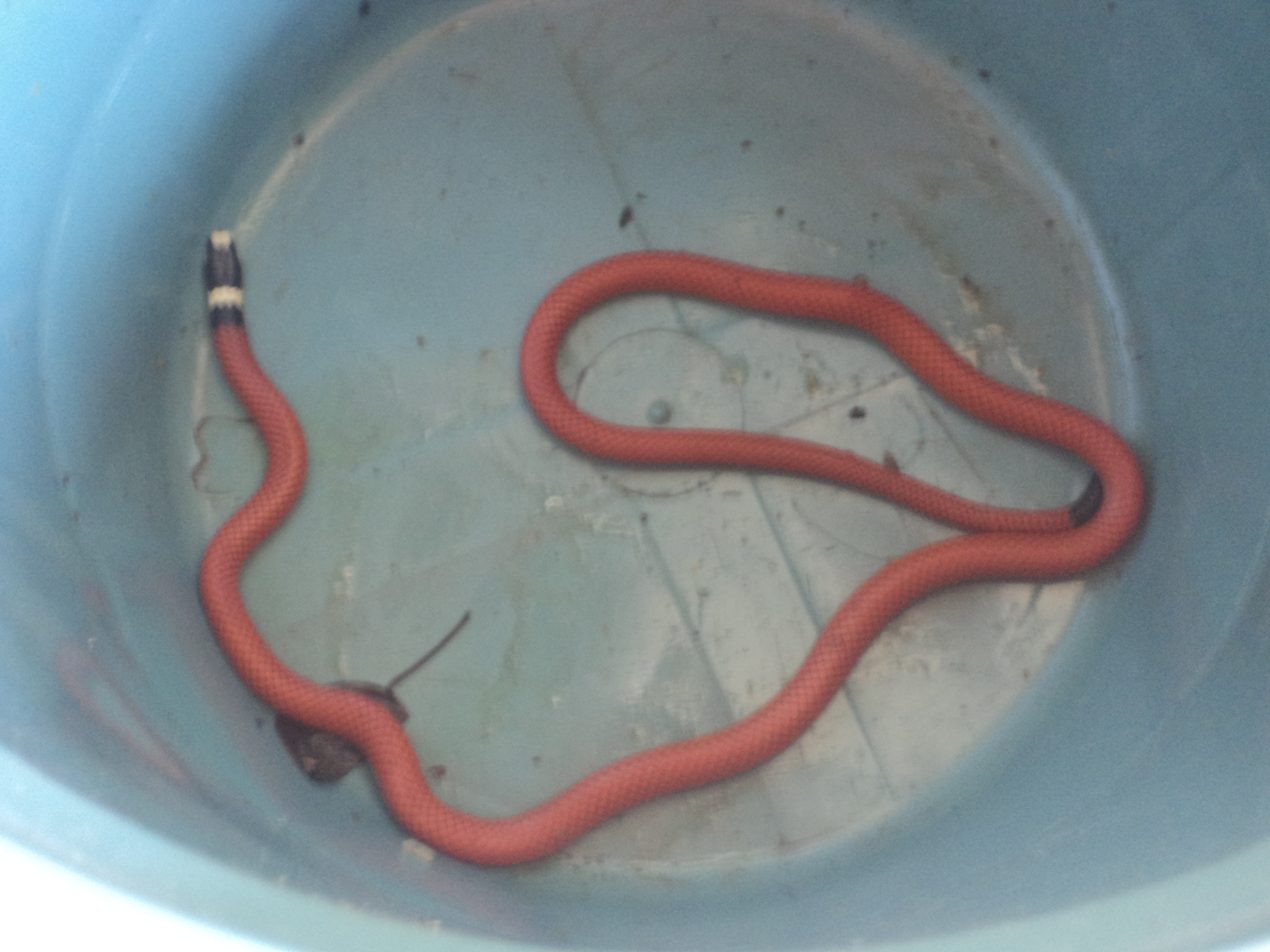

Conservation status
- Least Concern (IUCN 3.1)

Scientific classification
- Kingdom: Animalia
- Phylum: Chordata
- Class: Reptilia
- Order: Squamata
- Suborder: Serpentes
- Family: Colubridae
- Genus: Apostolepis
- Species: A. assimilis

Binomial name
- Apostolepis assimilis (Reinhardt, 1861)

Synonyms
- Elapomorphus assimilis Reinhardt, 1861

= Apostolepis assimilis =

Species of snake

Apostolepis assimilis (common name: Reinhardt's burrowing snake) is a species of snake in the family Colubridae. It is found in central and southwestern Brazil, eastern Paraguay, Bolivia, and northern Argentina; the Reptile Database, however, does not mention Bolivia and treats Argentina as uncertain.
