= Phalotris concolor =

Conservation status
- Data Deficient (IUCN 3.1)

Scientific classification
- Kingdom: Animalia
- Phylum: Chordata
- Class: Reptilia
- Order: Squamata
- Suborder: Serpentes
- Family: Colubridae
- Genus: Phalotris
- Species: P. concolor

Binomial name
- Phalotris concolor Ferrarezzi, 1993

Species of snake

Phalotris concolor is a species of snake in the family Colubridae. The species is endemic to Brazil, in the state of Minas Gerais.
