= Aerobic vaginitis =

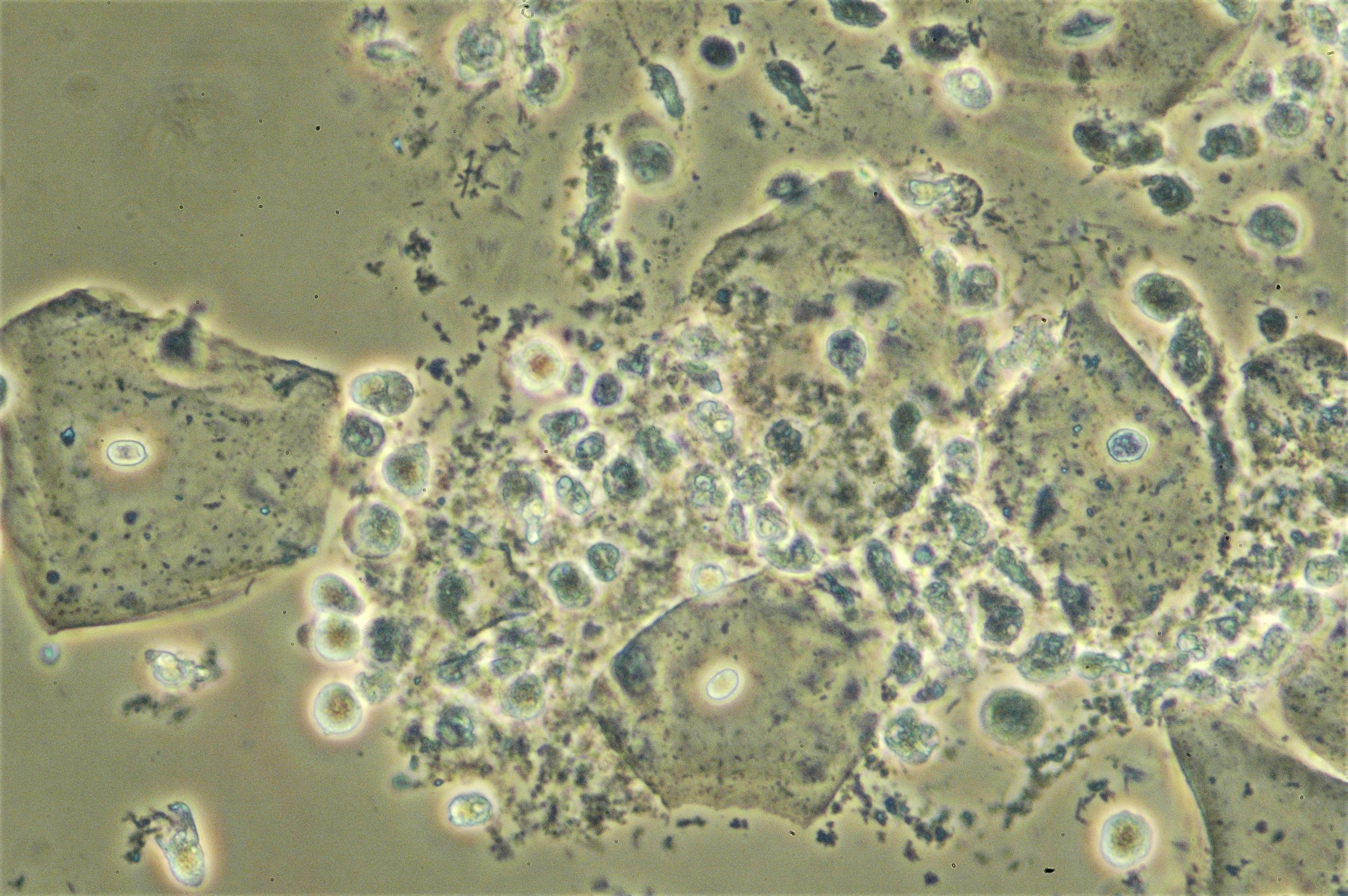
- Aerobic vaginitis: parabasal cells, absent lactobacilli and overgrowth of other bacilli, inflammation
- Specialty: Gynecology

Aerobic vaginitis (AV) is a form of vaginitis first described by Donders et al. in 2002. It is characterized by a more or less severe disruption of the lactobacillary flora, along with inflammation, atrophy, and the presence of a predominantly aerobic microflora, composed of enteric commensals or pathogens.

It is the aerobic counterpart of bacterial vaginosis. The lack of acknowledgement of the difference between the two conditions might have led to inaccurate conclusions in several studies in the past. The entity that has been described as "desquamative inflammatory vaginitis" probably corresponds to the more severe forms of aerobic vaginitis.

== Signs and symptoms ==
Women with aerobic vaginitis usually have a thinned reddish vaginal mucosa, sometimes with extensive erosions or ulcerations and abundant yellowish discharge (without the fishy amine odour, typical of bacterial vaginosis). Discharge is not always typical, and can range from sticky green/yellow to excessive and watery. The pH can be high, but can also be within normal range, making it an unreliable indicator for infection. Symptoms can include burning, stinging and dyspareunia. Symptoms typically improve during menstruation, and flare afterwards. The symptoms can last for long periods, sometimes even years. Typically, patients have been treated several times with antimycotic and antibiotic drugs without relief. In asymptomatic cases, there is microscopic evidence but no symptoms. The prevalence of asymptomatic cases is unknown.

=== Complications ===
Aerobic vaginitis has been associated with several gynecological and obstetrical complications, including:

- Premature rupture of membranes
- Preterm labour
- Ascending chorioamnionitis.
- Increased risk to acquire sexually transmitted infections (including HIV)
- Abnormal Pap test results

== Diagnosis ==
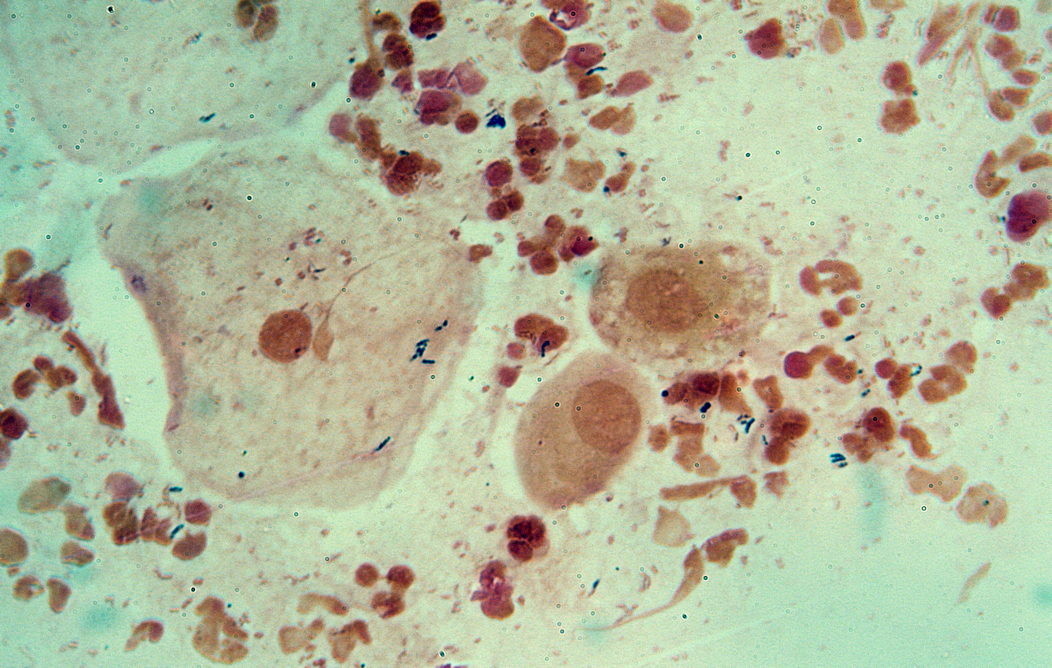
A typical case of aerobic vaginitis; absence of lactobacilli, presence of para-basal epithelial cells, and pus cells. Gram-positive cocci and Gram-negative bacilli are also present. (Gram stain)

The diagnosis is based on microscopic criteria. Ideally, phase-contrast microscopy is used with a magnification of 400x (high-power field) or by Gram stain. For scoring purposes, along with the relative number of leucocytes, percentage of toxic leucocytes, background flora, and proportion of epitheliocytes, lactobacillary grade must be evaluated:

grade I
numerous pleiomorphic lactobacilli; no other bacteria
grade IIa
mixed flora, but predominantly lactobacilli
grade IIb
mixed flora, but the proportion of lactobacilli severely decreased because of an increased number of other bacteria
grade III
lactobacilli severely depressed or absent because of the overgrowth of other bacteria

AV score	Lactobacillary grades	Number of leukocytes	Proportion of toxic leucocytes	Background flora	Proportion of parabasal epitheliocytes
0	I and IIa	<10/hpf	None or sporadic	Unremarkable or cytolysis	None or <1%
1	IIb	>10/hpf and; <10/epithelial cell	<50% of leukocytes	Small coliform bacilli	≤10%
2	III	>10/epithelial cell	>50% of leukocytes	Cocci or chains	>10%

The "AV score" is calculated according to what is described in the table.

- AV score <3: no signs of AV
- AV score 3 or 4: light AV
- AV score 5 or 6: moderate AV
- AV score ≥7:severe AV.

pH measurement alone is not enough for the diagnosis.

== Treatment ==
Treatment is not always easy and aims at correcting the three key changes encountered in aerobic vaginitis: the presence of atrophy, inflammation and abnormal flora. The treatment can include topical steroids to diminish the inflammation and topical estrogen to reduce the atrophy. The use and choice of antibiotics to diminish the load/proportion of aerobic bacteria is still a matter of debate. The use of local antibiotics, preferably local non-absorbed and broad-spectrum, covering enteric gram-positive and gram-negative aerobes, like kanamycin, can be an option. In some cases, systemic antibiotics can be helpful, such as Amoxicillin/clavulanic acidor moxifloxacin. Vaginal rinsing with povidone iodine can provide rapid relief of symptoms but does not provide long-term reduction of bacterial loads. Dequalinium chloride can also be an option for treatment. More recently, evidence of natural remedies such as topical herbal medicine, combined with biofilm disrupters such as EDTA, has proven successful in cases of aerobic vaginitis.

Biofilms prove yet another hurdle when treating aerobic vaginitis, especially in chronic cases. Topical biofilm disrupters, such as EDTA, can be useful, with systemic biofilm disrupters such as Serralase also having evidence of helping to disrupt bacterial biofilms, and helping to treat this condition.

== Epidemiology ==
About 5 to 10% of women are affected by aerobic vaginitis. Reports in pregnant women point to a prevalence of 8.3–10.8%.

When considering symptomatic women, the prevalence of AV can be as high as 23%.
