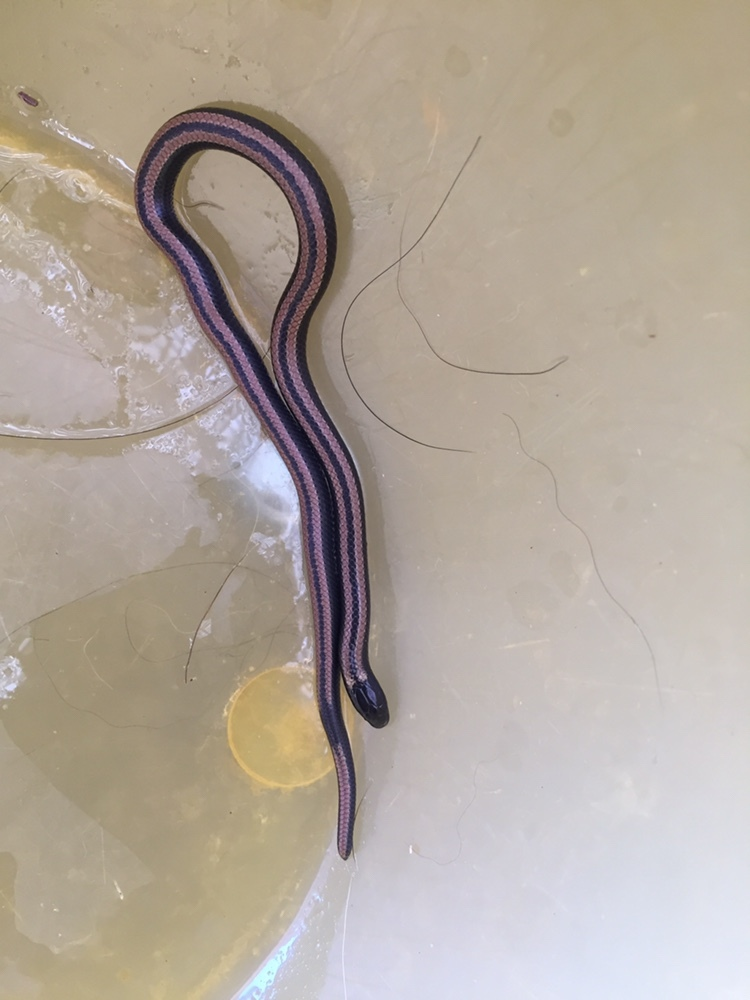

Conservation status
- Least Concern (IUCN 3.1)

Scientific classification
- Kingdom: Animalia
- Phylum: Chordata
- Class: Reptilia
- Order: Squamata
- Suborder: Serpentes
- Family: Colubridae
- Genus: Phalotris
- Species: P. lemniscatus

Binomial name
- Phalotris lemniscatus (A.M.C. Duméril, Bibron, & A.H.A. Duméril, 1854)

= Phalotris lemniscatus =

Species of snake

Phalotris lemniscatus is a species of venomous snake found in South America. It is usually known as Pampeana black headed snake or Duméril's diadem snake.

== Description and behavior ==
The fossorial habits certainly favor its adaptation, giving it less visibility in Anthropized areas. This species has a slender body, with a relatively reduced head, short tail, and size that generally does not exceed 50 cm in total length, although specimens of up to 68 cm have been reported. It feeds on small reptiles such as amphisbaenians, other snakes and lizards. Usually makes a defensive demonstration in the presence of a human, behaving in a shy and never aggressive way.

The color pattern and design allow an easy identification between the different snake species found in Uruguay. Dorsal coloration is reddish or orange with black longitudinal lines, and the vertebral region line may be absent or reduced. The head is mostly black and has a white collar, the central area is black.

== Distribution and habitat ==
This species has a wide distribution that includes Rio Grande do Sul in Brazil, northern Argentina, extending to the border areas of Bolivia and Paraguay, and in Uruguay, it is found throughout its territory. It is often found in open areas, adapting well to the urban and suburban areas.

== Venom ==
The venom of P. lemniscatus is composed of protein families typically present in snake venom, such as metalloproteinase and serine proteases, L-amino acid oxidases, Phospholipases A2s, C type lectines-like, Kunitz-type proteins, and three finger toxins. Activity assays demonstrated a highly Gelatinolytic component, as well as a potent capability to induce blood coagulation.

== Bites ==
Although bites by this species are rare, two important cases were recorded in Uruguay: a healthy 13-year-old patient was admitted to the emergency room for gingival bleeding after being bitten 12 hours earlier. The patient was playing with a snake, and was bitten on the left finger, the snake measured 20 cm in length and bit him for a long period of time. 30 minutes after the bite, there was ecchymosis in the area, without pain. The patient had mild, localized edema, and about 8 hours later, gingival bleeding began. Laboratory tests revealed changes in coagulation. Hospitalization was decided for observation and administration of antivenom.

In another case, a 61-year-old woman was admitted to the hospital after 12 hours. She had local pain, and mild headache, local hemorrhage, and genhivorrhagia. The patient presented bloody urine, epistaxis and hemoptysis, the hematuria was confirmed in the urinalysis. Due to coagulopathy, she was admitted to intensive care, requiring non-invasive ventilation, received 4 vials of anti-ophidic serum, preceded by corticosteroids, after treatment, the patient reached normal clotting values within 36 hours.

Lema (1978) also recorded an accident caused by a juvenile male of P. lemniscatus, which caused renal failure and hepatic failure, as well as minor brain damage, being treated with blood transfusion and application of antibotropic-crotalic serum.
