= Apostolepis breviceps =

Conservation status
- Least Concern (IUCN 3.1)

Scientific classification
- Kingdom: Animalia
- Phylum: Chordata
- Class: Reptilia
- Order: Squamata
- Suborder: Serpentes
- Family: Colubridae
- Genus: Apostolepis
- Species: A. breviceps

Binomial name
- Apostolepis breviceps Harvey, Gonzales, & Scrocchi, 2001

Species of snake

Apostolepis breviceps, the Chacoan blackhead, is a species of snake in the family Colubridae. It is endemic to Bolivia.
