= Apostolepis cearensis =

Conservation status
- Least Concern (IUCN 3.1)

Scientific classification
- Kingdom: Animalia
- Phylum: Chordata
- Class: Reptilia
- Order: Squamata
- Suborder: Serpentes
- Family: Colubridae
- Genus: Apostolepis
- Species: A. cearensis

Binomial name
- Apostolepis cearensis Gomes, 1915

Species of snake

Apostolepis cearensis, the Caatinga blackhead or Gomes's burrowing snake, is a species of snake in the family Colubridae. It is endemic to Brazil.
