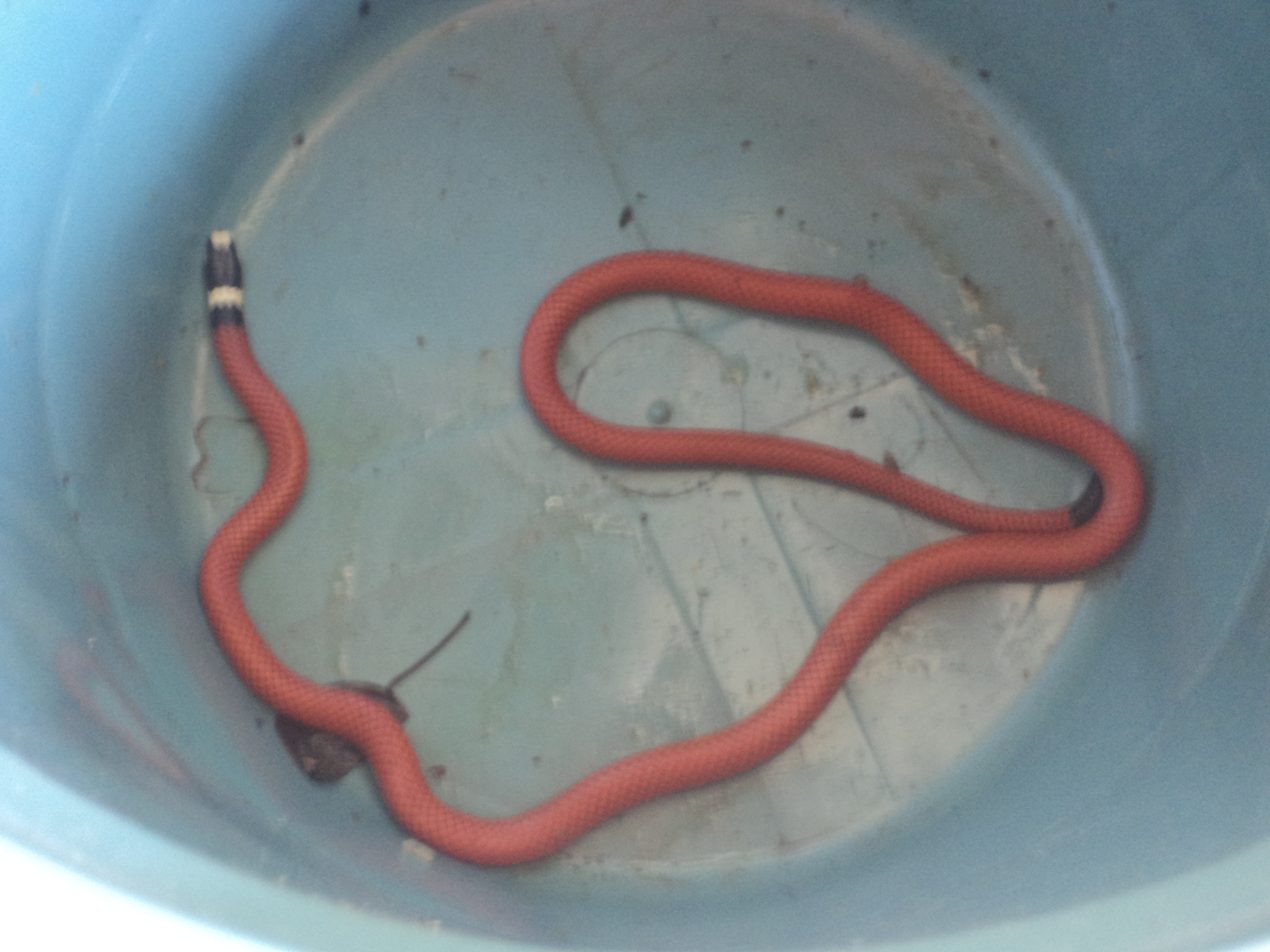
- Apostolepis assimilis

Scientific classification
- Kingdom: Animalia
- Phylum: Chordata
- Class: Reptilia
- Order: Squamata
- Suborder: Serpentes
- Family: Colubridae
- Subfamily: Dipsadinae
- Genus: Apostolepis; Cope, 1862

Type species
- Elapomorphus flavo-torquatus A.M.C. Duméril, Bibron, and A.H.A. Duméril, 1854

Species
- 36 species, see text.

= Apostolepis =

Genus of snakes

Apostolepis is a genus of snakes in the subfamily Dipsadinae. However, the familial placement differs among sources. It has also been placed in the family Colubridae, subfamily Dipsadinae or Xenodontinae, or in the family Xenodontidae. The genus Apostolepis is endemic to South America.

== Species ==
- Apostolepis adhara França, Barbo, Silva-Júnior, Silva & Zaher, 2018 – São Salvador burrow-snake
- Apostolepis albicollaris de Lema, 2002
- Apostolepis ambiniger (W. Peters, 1869) – Paraguayan blackhead
- Apostolepis arenaria Rodrigues, 1993 – sand dunes blackhead
- Apostolepis assimilis (Reinhardt, 1861) – Reinhardt's burrowing snake
- Apostolepis borellii Peracca, 1904
- Apostolepis breviceps Harvey, Gonzáles & Scrocchi, 2001 – Chacoan blackhead
- Apostolepis cearensis Gomes, 1915 – Caatinga blackhead, Gomes's burrowing snake
- Apostolepis christineae de Lema, 2002
- Apostolepis dimidiata (Jan, 1862) – common bilineate blackhead
- Apostolepis dorbignyi (Schlegel, 1837) – Dorbigny's blackhead, Bolivian burrowing snake
- Apostolepis flavotorquata (A.M.C. Duméril, Bibron & A.H.A. Duméril, 1854) – Cerrado blackhead, central burrowing snake
- Apostolepis gaboi Rodrigues, 1993 – sand dunes blackhead
- Apostolepis goiasensis Prado, 1942 – Prado’s blackhead, Goias burrowing snake
- Apostolepis intermedia Koslowsky, 1898 – Koslowsky's blackhead, Mato Grosso burrowing snake
- Apostolepis kikoi Santos, Entiauspe-Neto, Araujo, Souza, Lema, Strussmann & N. Albuquerque, 2018
- Apostolepis lineata Cope, 1887 – hognose lineate blackhead
- Apostolepis longicaudata Gomes, 1921 – Piauí blackhead, longhead burrowing snake
- Apostolepis multicincta Harvey, 1999 – Harvey's blackhead
- Apostolepis nelsonjorgei de Lema & Renner, 2004
- Apostolepis niceforoi Amaral, 1935 – Colombian blackhead, Amazon burrowing snake
- Apostolepis nigrolineata (W. Peters, 1869) – Pará blackhead
- Apostolepis nigroterminata Boulenger, 1896 – Peru blackhead, Peru burrowing snake
- Apostolepis phillipsae Harvey, 1999 – Phillips's blackhead
- Apostolepis polylepis Amaral, 1921 – hawbeack blackhead
- Apostolepis pymi Boulenger, 1903
- Apostolepis quirogai Giraudo & Scrocchi, 1998 – Misiones blackhead
- Apostolepis sanctaeritae F. Werner, 1924
- Apostolepis serrana de Lema & Renner, 2006
- Apostolepis striata de Lema, 2004
- Apostolepis tenuis Ruthven, 1927 – Bolivian blackhead, Ruthven's burrowing snake
- Apostolepis thalesdelemai Borges-Nojosa, Lima, Bezerra & Harris, 2017
- Apostolepis underwoodi de Lema & P. Campbell, 2017
- Apostolepis vittata (Cope, 1887) – beaked blackhead

Nota bene: A binomial authority in parentheses indicates that the species was originally described in a genus other than Apostolepis.
