= Phalotris mertensi =

Conservation status
- Least Concern (IUCN 3.1)

Scientific classification
- Kingdom: Animalia
- Phylum: Chordata
- Class: Reptilia
- Order: Squamata
- Suborder: Serpentes
- Family: Colubridae
- Genus: Phalotris
- Species: P. mertensi

Binomial name
- Phalotris mertensi (Hoge, 1955)

Synonyms
- Elapomorphus mertensi Hoge, 1955

Species of snake

Phalotris mertensi is a species of snake in the subfamily Dipsadinae of the family Colubridae. The species is native to central eastern South America.

== Etymology ==
The specific name, mertensi, is in honor of German herpetologist Robert Mertens.

== Geographic distribution ==
Phalotris mertensi is found in southeastern Brazil, in the Brazilian states of Goiás, Minas Gerais, Mato Grosso, Mato Grosso do Sul, Paraná, and São Paulo. It is also found in eastern Paraguay.

== Habitat ==
The preferred natural habitat of Phalotris mertensi is savanna.

== Description ==
A medium-sized species of snake, Phalotris mertensi may attain a snout-to-vent length (SVL) of 1.26 m (4.1 ft). Males reach sexual maturity at 48 cm (19 in) SVL, and females at 51 cm (20 in).

== Behavior ==
Phalotris mertensi is fossorial, and it is both diurnal and nocturnal.

== Diet ==
Phalotris mertensi preys upon caecilians.

== Reproduction ==
Phalotris mertensi is oviparous. Clutch size is from three to seven eggs.
