= Phalotris spegazzinii =

Scientific classification
- Kingdom: Animalia
- Phylum: Chordata
- Class: Reptilia
- Order: Squamata
- Suborder: Serpentes
- Family: Colubridae
- Genus: Phalotris
- Species: P. spegazzinii

Binomial name
- Phalotris spegazzinii (Boulenger, 1913)

Species of snake

Phalotris spegazzinii is a species of snake in the family Colubridae. The species is native to Brazil, Uruguay, and Argentina.
