= Phalotris lativittatus =

Conservation status
- Near Threatened (IUCN 3.1)

Scientific classification
- Kingdom: Animalia
- Phylum: Chordata
- Class: Reptilia
- Order: Squamata
- Suborder: Serpentes
- Family: Colubridae
- Genus: Phalotris
- Species: P. lativittatus

Binomial name
- Phalotris lativittatus Ferrarezzi, 1993

Species of snake

Phalotris lativittatus is a species of snake in the family Colubridae. The species is native to Brazil.
