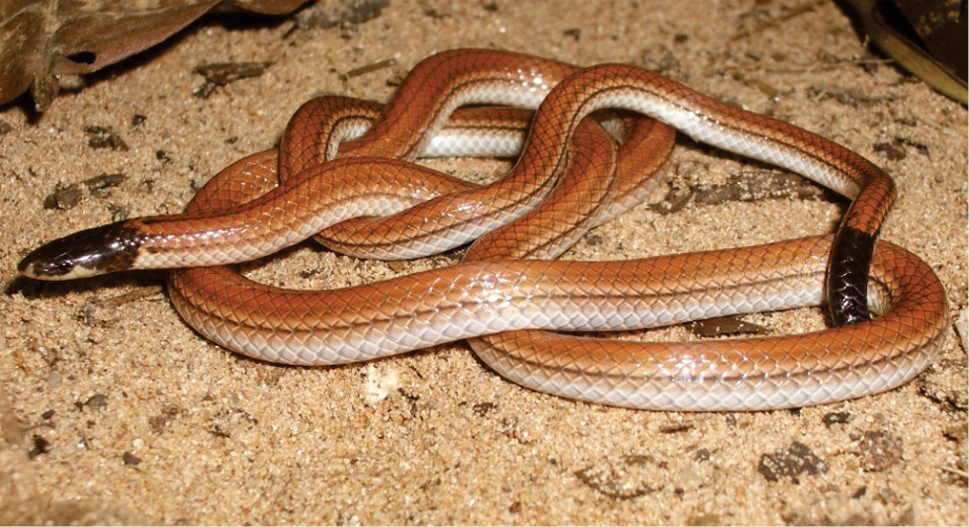

Conservation status
- Vulnerable (IUCN 3.1)

Scientific classification
- Kingdom: Animalia
- Phylum: Chordata
- Class: Reptilia
- Order: Squamata
- Suborder: Serpentes
- Family: Colubridae
- Genus: Apostolepis
- Species: A. vittata

Binomial name
- Apostolepis vittata (Cope, 1887)

= Apostolepis vittata =

Species of snake

Apostolepis vittata, commonly known as the beaked blackhead, is a species of snake in the family Colubridae. It is found in Brazil and Bolivia.
