= Phalotris sansebastiani =

Conservation status
- Least Concern (IUCN 3.1)

Scientific classification
- Kingdom: Animalia
- Phylum: Chordata
- Class: Reptilia
- Order: Squamata
- Suborder: Serpentes
- Family: Colubridae
- Genus: Phalotris
- Species: P. sansebastiani

Binomial name
- Phalotris sansebastiani Jansen & G. Köhler, 2008

Species of snake

Phalotris sansebastiani is a species of snake in the family Colubridae. This species is native to Bolivia.
