= Phalotris nigrilatus =

Conservation status
- Endangered (IUCN 3.1)

Scientific classification
- Kingdom: Animalia
- Phylum: Chordata
- Class: Reptilia
- Order: Squamata
- Suborder: Serpentes
- Family: Colubridae
- Genus: Phalotris
- Species: P. nigrilatus

Binomial name
- Phalotris nigrilatus Ferrarezzi, 1993

Species of snake

Phalotris nigrilatus is a species of snake in the family Colubridae. The species is native to Paraguay.
