= Phalotris reticulatus =

Conservation status
- Least Concern (IUCN 3.1)

Scientific classification
- Kingdom: Animalia
- Phylum: Chordata
- Class: Reptilia
- Order: Squamata
- Suborder: Serpentes
- Family: Colubridae
- Genus: Phalotris
- Species: P. reticulatus

Binomial name
- Phalotris reticulatus (Peters, 1860)

Species of snake

Phalotris reticulatus is a species of snake in the family Colubridae. The species is native to Brazil.
