= Apostolepis thalesdelemai =

Conservation status
- Least Concern (IUCN 3.1)

Scientific classification
- Kingdom: Animalia
- Phylum: Chordata
- Class: Reptilia
- Order: Squamata
- Suborder: Serpentes
- Family: Colubridae
- Genus: Apostolepis
- Species: A. thalesdelemai

Binomial name
- Apostolepis thalesdelemai Borges-Nojosa, Lima, Bezerra, & James, 2017

Species of snake

Apostolepis thalesdelemai is a species of snake in the family Colubridae. It is endemic to Brazil.
