= Phalotris multipunctatus =

Conservation status
- Endangered (IUCN 3.1)

Scientific classification
- Kingdom: Animalia
- Phylum: Chordata
- Class: Reptilia
- Order: Squamata
- Suborder: Serpentes
- Family: Colubridae
- Genus: Phalotris
- Species: P. multipunctatus

Binomial name
- Phalotris multipunctatus Puorto & Ferrarezzi, 1993

Species of snake

Phalotris multipunctatus is a species of snake in the family Colubridae. The species is native to Brazil.
