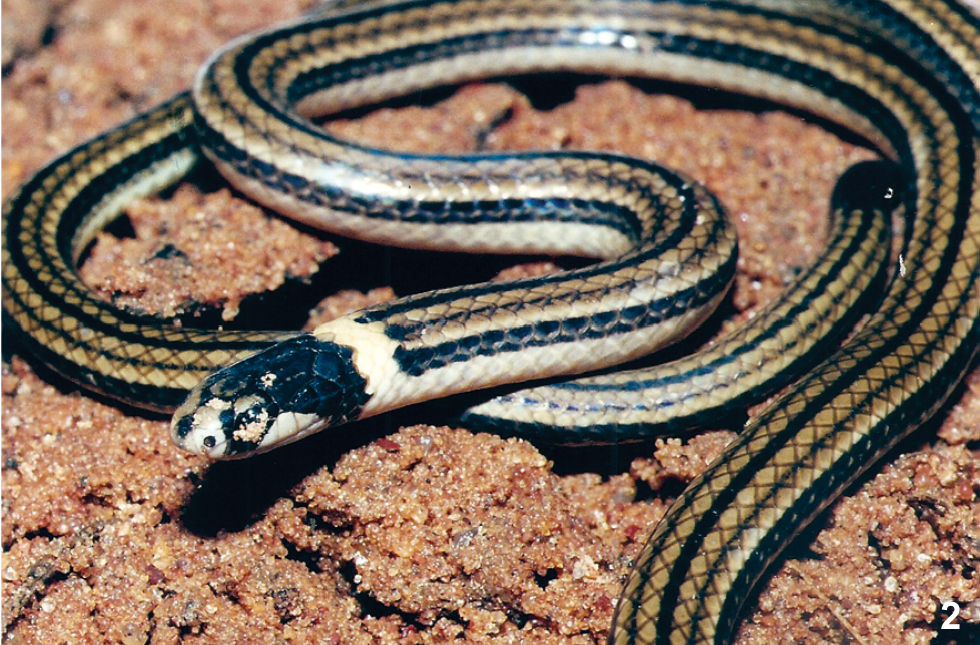

Scientific classification
- Domain: Eukaryota
- Kingdom: Animalia
- Phylum: Chordata
- Class: Reptilia
- Order: Squamata
- Suborder: Serpentes
- Family: Colubridae
- Genus: Apostolepis
- Species: A. kikoi

Binomial name
- Apostolepis kikoi Santos, Entiauspe-Neto, Silva-Araújo, Souza, Lema, Strussmann, & Albuquerque, 2018

= Apostolepis kikoi =

Species of snake

Apostolepis kikoi is a species of snake in the family Colubridae. It is endemic to Brazil.
