= Apostolepis striata =

Conservation status
- Critically Endangered (IUCN 3.1)

Scientific classification
- Kingdom: Animalia
- Phylum: Chordata
- Class: Reptilia
- Order: Squamata
- Suborder: Serpentes
- Family: Colubridae
- Genus: Apostolepis
- Species: A. striata

Binomial name
- Apostolepis striata de Lema, 2004

Species of snake

Apostolepis striata, commonly known as Cobra-rainha estriada, is a species of snake in the family Colubridae. It is endemic to Brazil.
