= Phalotris bilineatus =

Conservation status
- Least Concern (IUCN 3.1)

Scientific classification
- Kingdom: Animalia
- Phylum: Chordata
- Class: Reptilia
- Order: Squamata
- Suborder: Serpentes
- Family: Colubridae
- Genus: Phalotris
- Species: P. bilineatus

Binomial name
- Phalotris bilineatus (A.M.C. Duméril, Bibron, & A.H.A. Duméril, 1854)

Species of snake

Phalotris bilineatus, Dumeril's diadem snake, is a species of snake in the family Colubridae. The species is native to Argentina.
