= Apostolepis serrana =

Conservation status
- Endangered (IUCN 3.1)

Scientific classification
- Kingdom: Animalia
- Phylum: Chordata
- Class: Reptilia
- Order: Squamata
- Suborder: Serpentes
- Family: Colubridae
- Genus: Apostolepis
- Species: A. serrana

Binomial name
- Apostolepis serrana de Lema & Renner, 2006

Species of snake

Apostolepis serrana, commonly known as Cobra-rainha da Serra do Roncador, is a species of snake in the family Colubridae. It is endemic to Brazil.
