= Phalotris suspectus =

Scientific classification
- Kingdom: Animalia
- Phylum: Chordata
- Class: Reptilia
- Order: Squamata
- Suborder: Serpentes
- Family: Colubridae
- Genus: Phalotris
- Species: P. suspectus

Binomial name
- Phalotris suspectus (Amaral, 1924)

Species of snake

Phalotris suspectus, Dumeril's diadem snake, is a species of snake in the family Colubridae. The species is native to Argentina.
