= Apostolepis gaboi =

Conservation status
- Endangered (IUCN 3.1)

Scientific classification
- Kingdom: Animalia
- Phylum: Chordata
- Class: Reptilia
- Order: Squamata
- Suborder: Serpentes
- Family: Colubridae
- Genus: Apostolepis
- Species: A. gaboi

Binomial name
- Apostolepis gaboi Rodrigues, 1993

Species of snake

Apostolepis gaboi, known commonly as the sand dunes blackhead and the cobra-rainha das dunas in Brazilian Portuguese, is a species of snake in the family Colubridae. The species is endemic to Brazil.

== Etymology ==
The specific name, gaboi, is in honor of Uruguayan zoologist Gabriel Omar Skuk Sugliano, whose nickname is "Gabo".

== Geographic range ==
A. gaboi is found in the Brazilian state of Bahia.

== Habitat ==
The preferred natural habitat of A. gaboi is shrubland with sandy soil.

== Description ==
Dorsally, A. gaboi is rust-colored, with seven black lines. The tip of the tail is black, resembling the head. The fifth and sixth upper labials contact the parietal.

== Behavior ==
A. gaboi is fossorial, and it is both diurnal and nocturnal.

== Reproduction ==
A. gaboi is oviparous.
