= Hematuria =

Presence of blood in urine

- Other names: Haematuria, erythrocyturia, blood in the urine
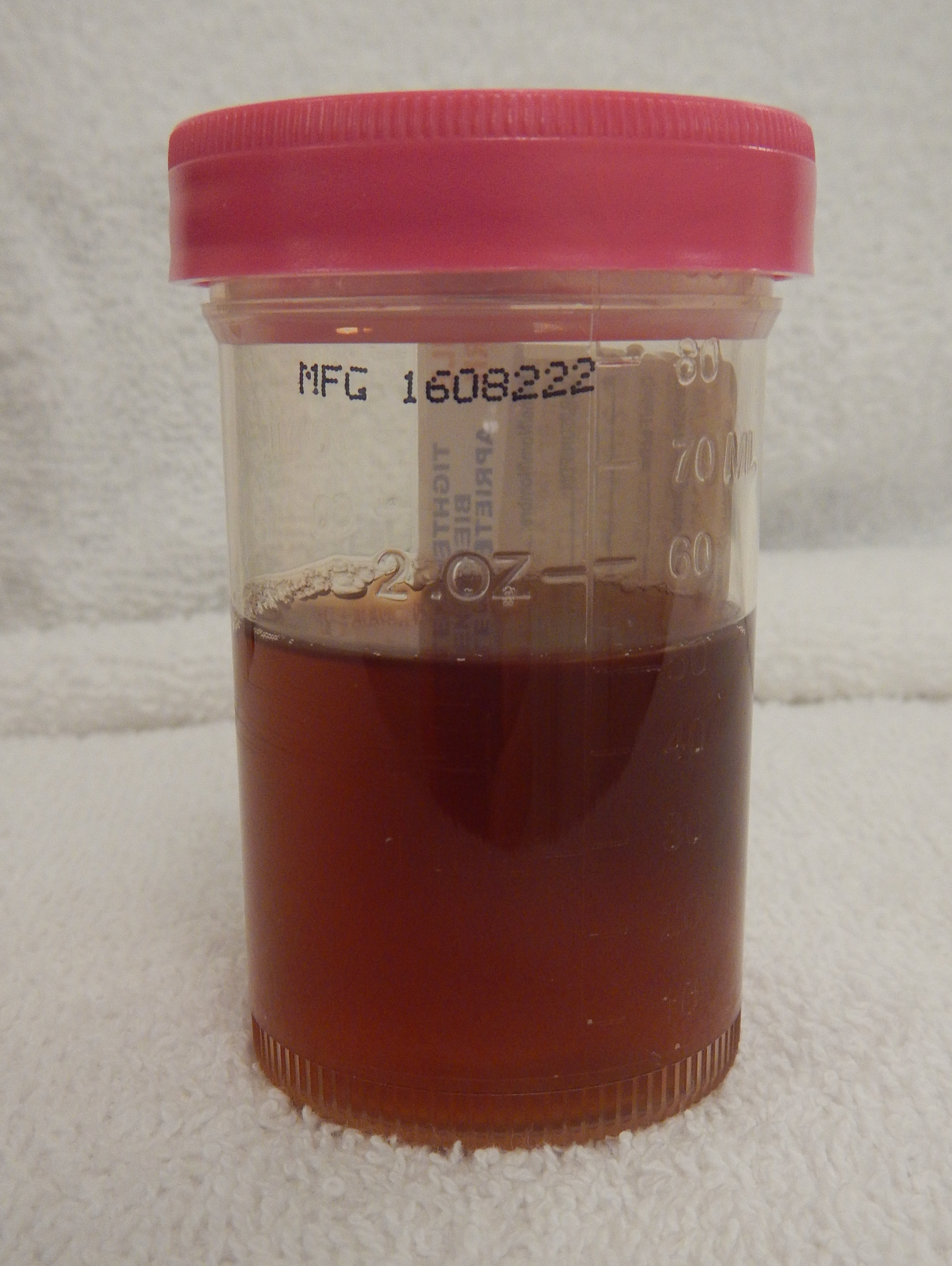
- Visible hematuria that is tea-colored
- Specialty: Nephrology, Urology
- Symptoms: Blood in the urine
- Causes: Urinary tract infection, kidney stone, bladder cancer, kidney cancer

Hematuria or haematuria is defined as the presence of blood or red blood cells in the urine. "Gross hematuria" occurs when urine appears red, brown, or tea-colored due to the presence of blood. Hematuria may also be subtle and only detectable with a microscope or laboratory test. Blood that enters and mixes with the urine can come from any location within the urinary system, including the kidney, ureter, urinary bladder, urethra, and in men, the prostate. Common causes of hematuria include urinary tract infection (UTI), kidney stones, viral illness, trauma, bladder cancer, and exercise. These causes are grouped into glomerular and non-glomerular causes, depending on the involvement of the glomerulus of the kidney. But not all red urine is hematuria. Other substances such as certain medications and some foods (e.g. blackberries, beets, food dyes) can cause urine to appear red. Menstruation in women may also cause the appearance of hematuria and may result in a positive urine dipstick test for hematuria. A urine dipstick test may also give an incorrect positive result for hematuria if there are other substances in the urine such as myoglobin, a protein excreted into urine during rhabdomyolysis. A positive urine dipstick test should be confirmed with microscopy, where hematuria is defined by three or more red blood cells per high power field. When hematuria is detected, a thorough history and physical examination with appropriate further evaluation (e.g., laboratory testing) can help determine the underlying cause.

== Differential diagnosis ==
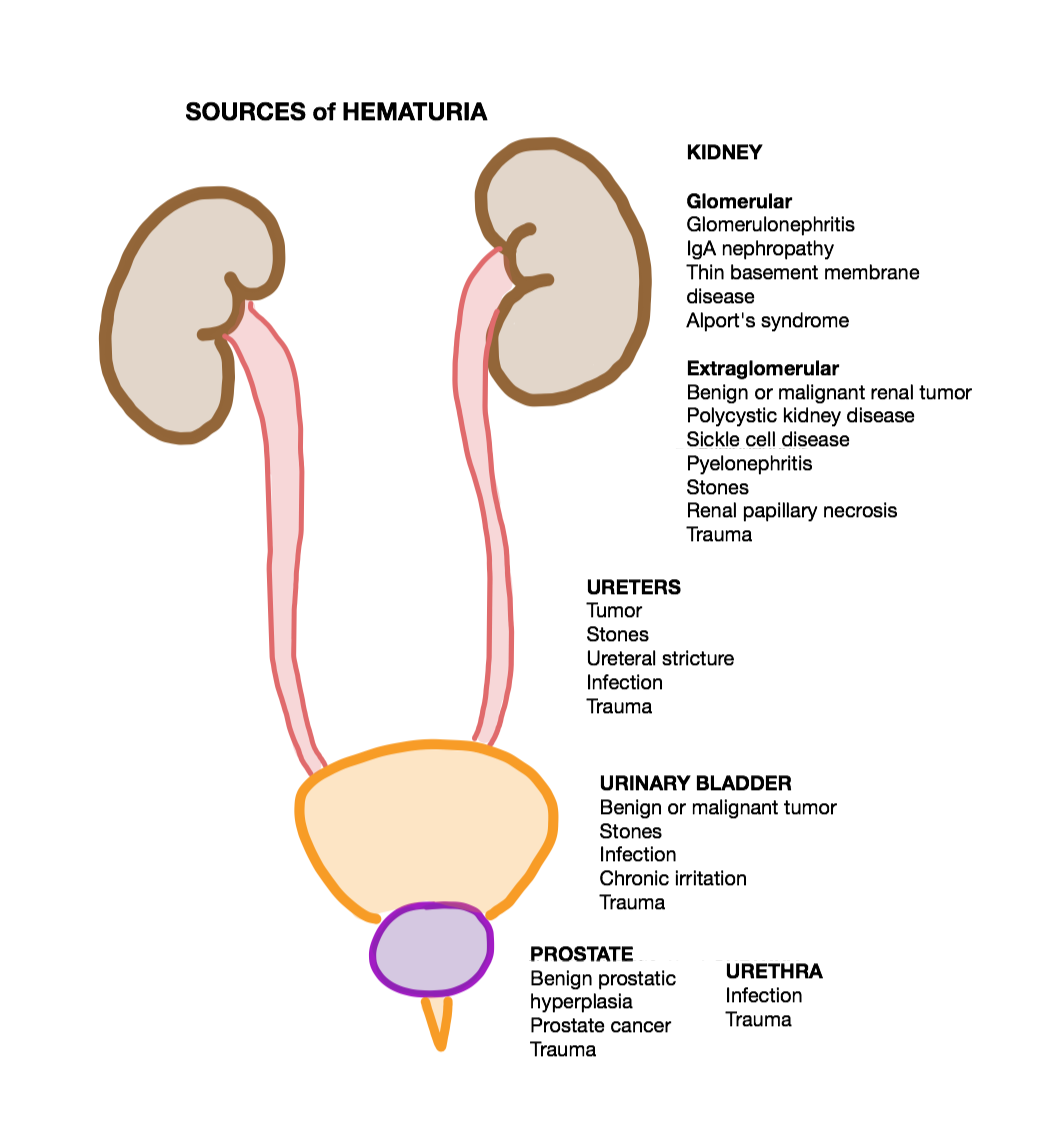

Hematuria can be classified according to visibility, anatomical origin, and timing of blood during urination.

- In terms of visibility, hematuria can be visible to the naked eye (termed gross hematuria) and may appear red or brown (sometimes referred to as tea-colored), or it can be microscopic (i.e., not visible but detected with a microscope or laboratory test). Microscopic hematuria is present when there are three or more red blood cells per high power field.
- In terms of the anatomical origin, blood or red blood cells can enter and mix with urine at multiple anatomical sites within the urinary system, including the kidney, ureter, urinary bladder, and urethra, and in men, the prostate. Additionally menstruation in women may cause the appearance of hematuria and may result in a positive urine dipstick test for hematuria. The causes corresponding to these anatomic locations can be divided into glomerular and non-glomerular causes, referring to the involvement of the glomerulus of the kidney. Non-glomerular causes can be further subdivided into upper urinary tract and lower urinary tract causes.
- In terms of the timing during urination, hematuria can be initial, total, or terminal, meaning blood can appear in the urine at the onset, midstream, or later. If it appears soon after the onset of urination, a distal site is suggested. Hematuria that occurs throughout urination suggests that bleeding is occurring above the level of the bladder. A longer delay suggests a more proximal lesion.

Many causes may present as either visible hematuria or microscopic hematuria, and so the differential diagnosis is frequently organized based on glomerular and non-glomerular causes.

=== Glomerular hematuria ===
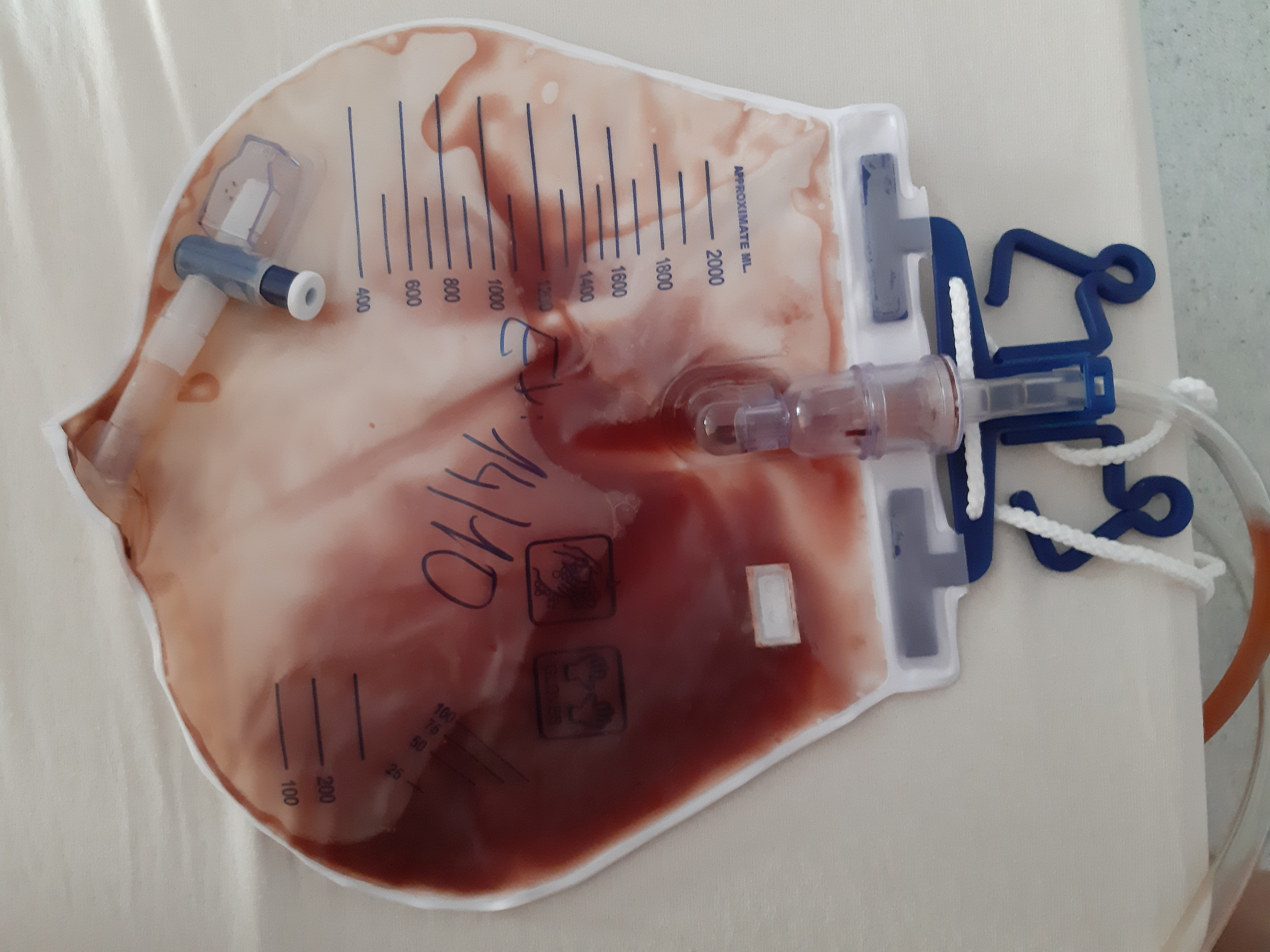
Postrenal hematuria - the presence of blood in urine (because of damage to the urethra and prostate).

Hematuria due to a glomerular source commonly presents as dysmorphic red blood cells (misshapen red blood cells) or red cell casts (small tubular structures made up of red blood cell components) on urine microscopy. This occurs due to the red blood cells being deformed as they pass through the glomerular capillaries into the renal tubules and eventually into the urinary system. Normally red blood cells should never pass from the glomerular capillary into the renal tubule, and this is always a pathological process. Glomerular causes include:

- IgA nephropathy
- Thin glomerular basement membrane disease
- Hereditary nephritis (Alport's disease)
- Hemolytic uremic syndrome
- Postinfectious glomerulonephritis (group A β-hemolytic streptococcus pyogenes)
- Membranoproliferative glomerulonephritis
- Lupus nephritis
- Henoch–Schönlein purpura
- Nephritic syndrome
- Nephrotic syndrome
- Polycystic kidney disease
- Idiopathic hematuria

=== Non-glomerular hematuria ===
Visible blood clots in the urine indicate a non-glomerular cause. Non-glomerular causes include:

- Urinary tract infections, such as pyelonephritis, cystitis, prostatitis, and urethritis
- Kidney stones
- Cancers, such as renal cell carcinoma and bladder cancer (particularly transitional cell carcinoma), and in men, prostate cancer
- Urinary tract strictures
- Benign prostatic hyperplasia
- Renal papillary necrosis
- Trauma or damage to the lining of the urinary tract
- Intense exercise
- Increased tendency to bleed due to acquired or genetic conditions (e.g. sickle cell disease or vitamin K deficiency bleeding) or certain medications (e.g. blood thinners)

=== Mimickers of hematuria ===
==== Pigmenturia ====
Not all red or brown urine is caused by hematuria. Other substances such as certain medications and certain foods can cause urine to appear red.

Medications that may cause urine to appear red include:

- Phenazopyridine
- Nitrofurantoin
- Doxorubicin
- Rifampicin

Foods that may cause urine to appear red include:

- Blackberries
- Food dyes.
- Beets
- Rhubarb
- Fava beans

==== False positive urine dipstick ====
A urine dipstick may be falsely positive for hematuria due to other substances in the urine. While the urine dipstick test is able to recognize heme in red blood cells, it also identifies free hemoglobin and myoglobin. Free hemoglobin may be found in the urine resulting from hemolysis, and myoglobin may be found in the urine resulting from rhabdomyolysis (muscle breakdown). Thus, a positive dipstick test does not necessarily indicate hematuria; rather, microscopy of the urine showing three of more red blood cells per high power field confirms hematuria.

==== Menstruation ====
In women, menstruation may cause the appearance of hematuria and may result in a urine dipstick test positive for hematuria. Menstruation can be ruled out as a cause of hematuria by inquiring about menstruation history and ensuring the urine specimen is collected without menstrual blood.

== In children ==
Common causes of hematuria in children are:

- Fever
- Strenuous exercise
- Acute nephritis
- Congenital abnormalities:
  1. Non-vascular: ureteropelvic junction obstruction, posterior urethral valves, urethral prolapse, urethral diverticulum and multicystic dysplastic kidney
  2. Vascular: arteriovenous malformations, hereditary hemorrhagic telangiectasias, renal vein thrombosis in newborns.
- Urinary stones.
- Coagulation disorders.
- Mechanical trauma: masturbation, foreign body.
- Nephritic syndrome: IgA nephropathy, Post-streptococcal glomerulonephritis, Benign familial hematuria, Alport syndrome.
- Sickle cell trait or disease.

== Evaluation ==
The evaluation of hematuria is dependent upon the visibility of the blood in the urine (i.e. visible/gross vs microscopic hematuria). Visible hematuria must be investigated, as it may be due to a pathological cause. In those with visible hematuria, urological cancer (most frequently bladder or kidney cancer) is discovered in 20–25%. Hematuria alone without accompanying symptoms should be raise suspicion of malignancy of the urinary tract until proven otherwise. The initial evaluation of patients presenting with signs and symptoms that are consistent of hematuria include assessment of hemodynamic status, underlying cause of hematuria, and ensuring urinary drainage. These steps include assessment of the patient's heart rate, blood pressure, a physician exam taken by a healthcare professional, and blood work to ensure the patient's hemodynamic status is adequate. It is important to obtain a detailed history from the patient (i.e. recreational, occupational, and medication exposures) as this information can be helpful in suggesting a cause of hematuria. The physical exam can also be helpful in identifying a cause of the hematuria as certain signs found on the physical exam can suggest specific causes of the hematuria. In the event the initial evaluation of hematuria does not reveal an underlying cause then evaluation by a physician who specializes in Urology may proceed. This medical evaluation may consist of, but is not limited too, a history and physical exam taken by healthcare personnel, laboratory studies (i.e. blood work), cystoscopy, and specialized imaging procedures (i.e. CT or MRI).

=== Visible hematuria ===
The first step in evaluation of red or brown colored urine is to confirm true hematuria with urinalysis and urine microscopy, where hematuria is defined by three of more red blood cells per high power field. Although a urine dipstick test may be used, it can give false positive or false negative results. In gathering information, it is important to inquire about recent trauma, urologic procedures, menses, and culture-documented urinary tract infection. If any of these are present, it is appropriate to repeat a urinalysis with urine microscopy in 1 to 2 weeks or after treatment of the infection. If the results of the urinalysis and urine microscopy reveal a glomerular origin of hematuria (indicated by proteinuria or red blood cell casts), consultation with a nephrologist should be made. If the results of the urinalysis indicate a non-glomerular origin, a microbiological culture of the urine should be performed, if it has not been done already. If the culture is positive (indicating a bladder infection), urinalysis and urine microscopy should be repeated following treatment to confirm resolution of the hematuria. If the culture is negative or if hematuria persists after treatment, CT urogram or renal ultrasound and cystoscopy should be performed. Hemodynamic stability should be monitored and a complete blood count should be ordered to assess for anemia.

=== Microscopic hematuria ===
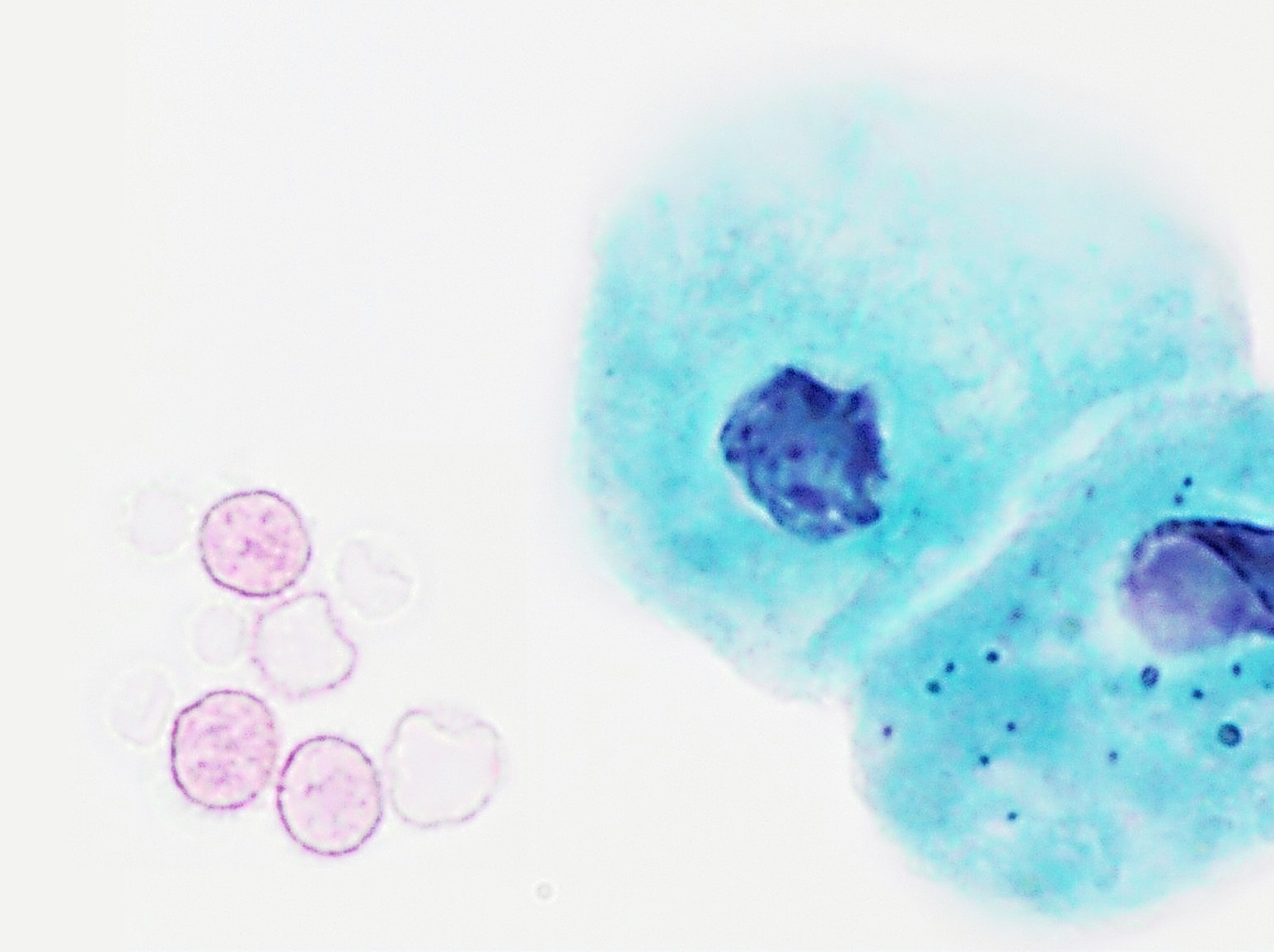
Red blood cells seen on light microscopy on urinary cytology, next to benign urothelial cells (pap stain).

After detecting and confirming hematuria with urinalysis and urine microscopy, the first step in evaluation of microhematuria is to rule out benign causes. Benign causes include urinary tract infection, viral illness, kidney stone, recent intense exercise, menses, recent trauma, or recent urological procedure. After benign causes have resolved or been treated, a repeat urinalysis and urine microscopy is warranted to ensure cessation of hematuria. If hematuria persists (even if there is a suspected cause), the next step is to stratify the risk of the person for urothelial cancer into low, intermediate, or high risk to determine next steps. To be in the low risk category, one must satisfy all of the following criteria: Has never smoked tobacco or smoked less than 10 pack-years; is a female less than 50 years old or a male less than 40 years old; has 3–10 red blood cells per high power field; has not had microscopic hematuria before; and has no other risk factors for urothelial cancer. To be in the intermediate risk category, one must satisfy any of the following criteria: Has smoked 10–30 pack-years; is a female 50–59 years old or a male aged 40–59 years old; has 11–25 red blood cells per high power field; or was previously a low-risk patient with persistent microscopic hematuria and has 3–25 red blood cells per high power field. To be in the high risk category, one must satisfy any of the following criteria: Has smoked more than 30 pack-years; is older than 60 years of age; or has above 25 red blood cells per high power field on any urinalysis. For the low risk category, the next step is to either repeat a urinalysis with urine microscopy in 6 months or perform a cystoscopy and renal ultrasound. For the intermediate risk category, the next step is to perform a cystoscopy and renal ultrasound. For the high risk category, the next step is to perform a cystoscopy and CT urogram. If an underlying cause for hematuria is discovered, it should be managed appropriately. However, if no underlying cause is discovered, the hematuria should be re-evaluated with urinalysis and urine microscopy within 12 months. Additionally, for all risk categories, if a nephrologic origin is suspected, consultation of a nephrologist should be made.

== Pathophysiology ==
The pathophysiology of hematuria can often be explained by damage to the structures of the urinary system, including the kidney, ureter, urinary bladder, and urethra, and in men, the prostate. Common mechanisms include structural disruption to the glomerular basement membrane and mechanical or chemical erosion of the mucosal surfaces of the genitourinary tract.

== Management ==
=== Medical emergency: acute clot retention ===
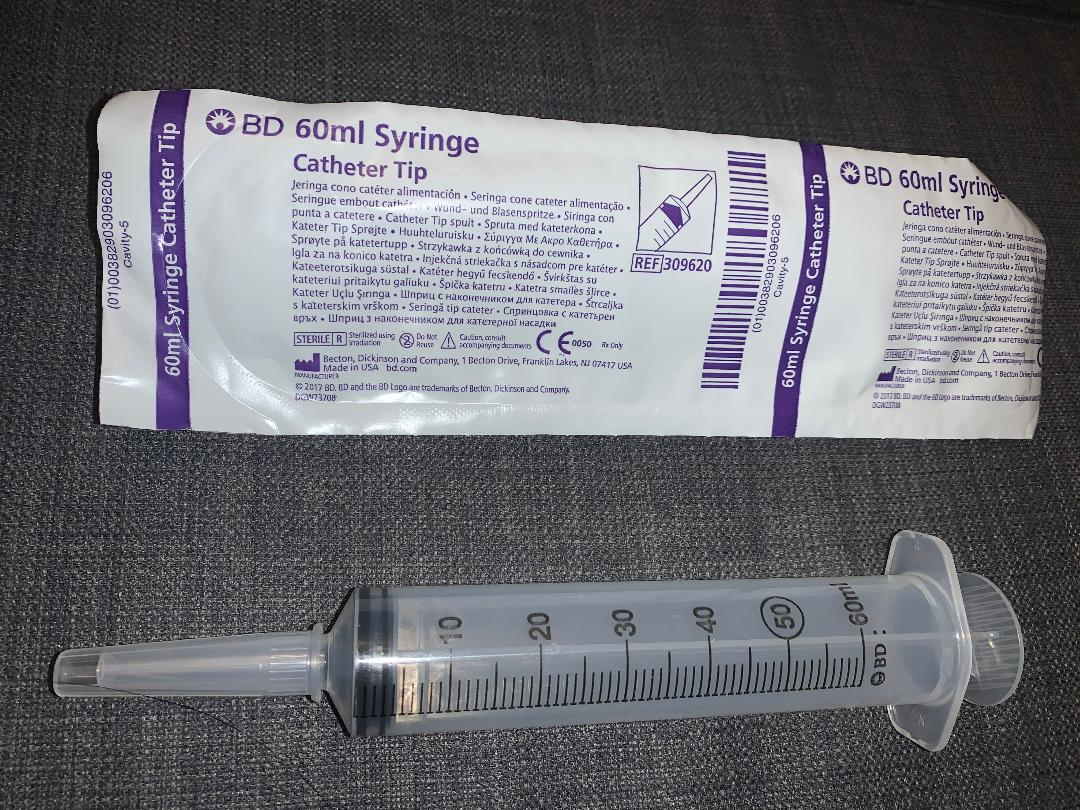
A 60cc/mL Toomey syringe.: 1. Fill syringe with saline.; 2. Connect syringe to a catheter port.; 3. Instill 180cc of saline.; 4. Draw back 180cc of bladder urine.; 5. Dispose of medical waste.; 6. Repeat until all clots are removed.

Acute clot retention is one of three emergencies that can occur with hematuria. The other two are anemia and shock. Blood clots can prevent urine outflow through either ureter or the bladder. This is known as acute urinary retention.

Blood clots that remain in the bladder are digested by urinary urokinase producing fibrin fragments. These fibrin fragments are natural anticoagulants and promote ongoing bleeding from the urinary tract. Removing all blood clots prevents the formation of this natural anticoagulant. This in turns facilitates the cessation of bleeding from the urinary tract.

The acute management of obstructing clots is the placement of a large (22–24 French) urethral Foley catheter. Clots are evacuated with a Toomey syringe and saline irrigation. If this does not control the bleeding, management should escalate to continuous bladder irrigation (CBI) via a three-port urethral catheter. If both a large urethral Foley catheter and CBI fail, an urgent cystoscopy in the operating room will be necessary. Lastly, a transfusion and/or a correction of a coexisting coagulopathy may be necessary.

=== Medical emergency: urosepsis ===
Urosepsis is defined as sepsis caused by a urogenital tract infection and comprises about 25% of all sepsis cases. Urosepsis is the result of a systemic inflammatory response to infection and can be identified by numerous signs and symptoms (e.g. fever, hypothermia, tachycardia, and leukocytosis). Signs and symptoms that indicate a urogential tract infection is the source of the sepsis may include, but are not limited to, flank pain, costovertebral angle tenderness, pain with micturition, urinary retention, and scrotal pain. In terms of the visibility, hematuria can be visible to the naked eye (termed "gross hematuria") and may appear red or brown (sometimes referred to as tea-colored), or it can be microscopic (i.e. not visible to the eye but detected of urosepsis. In addition to imaging tests, patients may be treated with antibiotics to relieve the infection and intravenous fluids to maintain cardiovascular and renal perfusion. Acute management of hemodynamic status, in the event intravenous fluids are unsuccessful, may include the use of vasopressor medications and the placement of a central venous line.

== Epidemiology ==
In the United States, microscopic hematuria has a prevalence of somewhere between 2% and 31%. Higher rates exist in individuals older than 60 years of age and those with a current or prior history of smoking. Only a fraction of individuals with microhematuria are diagnosed with a urologic cancer. When asymptomatic populations are screened with dipstick and/or microscopy medical testing about 2% to 3% of those with hematuria have a urologic malignancy. Routine screening is not recommended. Individuals with risk factors who undergo repeated testing have higher rates of urologic malignancies. These risks factors include age (> 40 years), male gender, previous or current smoking, chemical exposure (e.g., benzenes, hydrocarbons, aromatic amines), history of chemotherapy (alkylating agents, ifosfamide), prolonged foreign body in the bladder (such as a bladder catheter), prior pelvic radiation therapy, or greater than 25 red blood cells per high powered field on urine microscopy.

The prevalence of microscopic hematuria in North Africa is very high due to the high prevalence of the blood fluke schistosoma haematobium, which chronically infects the urinary tract.

In pediatric populations, the prevalence is 0.5–2%. Risks factor include older age and female gender. About 5% of individuals with microscopic hematuria receive a cancer diagnosis. 40% of individuals with macroscopic hematuria (blood easily visible in the urine) receive a cancer diagnosis.
