= Apostolepis intermedia =

Conservation status
- Least Concern (IUCN 3.1)

Scientific classification
- Kingdom: Animalia
- Phylum: Chordata
- Class: Reptilia
- Order: Squamata
- Suborder: Serpentes
- Family: Colubridae
- Genus: Apostolepis
- Species: A. intermedia

Binomial name
- Apostolepis intermedia Koslowsky, 1898

Species of snake

Apostolepis intermedia, commonly known as Koslowsky's blackhead or the Mato Grosso burrowing snake, is a species of snake in the family Colubridae. It is found in Brazil and Paraguay.
