= Adelphostigma quadriocellata =

Conservation status
- Least Concern (IUCN 3.1)

Scientific classification
- Kingdom: Animalia
- Phylum: Chordata
- Class: Reptilia
- Order: Squamata
- Suborder: Serpentes
- Family: Colubridae
- Genus: Adelphostigma
- Species: A. quadriocellata

Binomial name
- Adelphostigma quadriocellata (Santos, Di-Bernardo, & de Lema, 2008)

Synonyms
- Taeniophallus quadriocellatus Santos, Di-Bernardo, & de Lema, 2008

Species of snake

Adelphostigma quadriocellata is a species of snake in the family Colubridae. It is found in Brazil. It is oviparous.
