= Apostolepis underwoodi =

Scientific classification
- Kingdom: Animalia
- Phylum: Chordata
- Class: Reptilia
- Order: Squamata
- Suborder: Serpentes
- Family: Colubridae
- Genus: Apostolepis
- Species: A. underwoodi

Binomial name
- Apostolepis underwoodi de Lema & Campbell, 2017

Species of snake

Apostolepis underwoodi is a species of snake in the family Colubridae. It is endemic to Bolivia.
