= Apostolepis arenaria =

Conservation status
- Endangered (IUCN 3.1)

Scientific classification
- Kingdom: Animalia
- Phylum: Chordata
- Class: Reptilia
- Order: Squamata
- Suborder: Serpentes
- Family: Colubridae
- Genus: Apostolepis
- Species: A. arenaria

Binomial name
- Apostolepis arenaria Rodrigues, 1993

Species of snake

Apostolepis arenaria, the sand dunes blackhead, is a species of snake in the family Colubridae. It is endemic to Brazil.
