= Phalotris labiomaculatus =

Conservation status
- Least Concern (IUCN 3.1)

Scientific classification
- Kingdom: Animalia
- Phylum: Chordata
- Class: Reptilia
- Order: Squamata
- Suborder: Serpentes
- Family: Colubridae
- Genus: Phalotris
- Species: P. labiomaculatus

Binomial name
- Phalotris labiomaculatus de Lema, 2002

Species of snake

Phalotris labiomaculatus is a species of snake in the family Colubridae. The species is endemic to Brazil.
