= Microhematuria =

Presence of small amounts of blood in urine

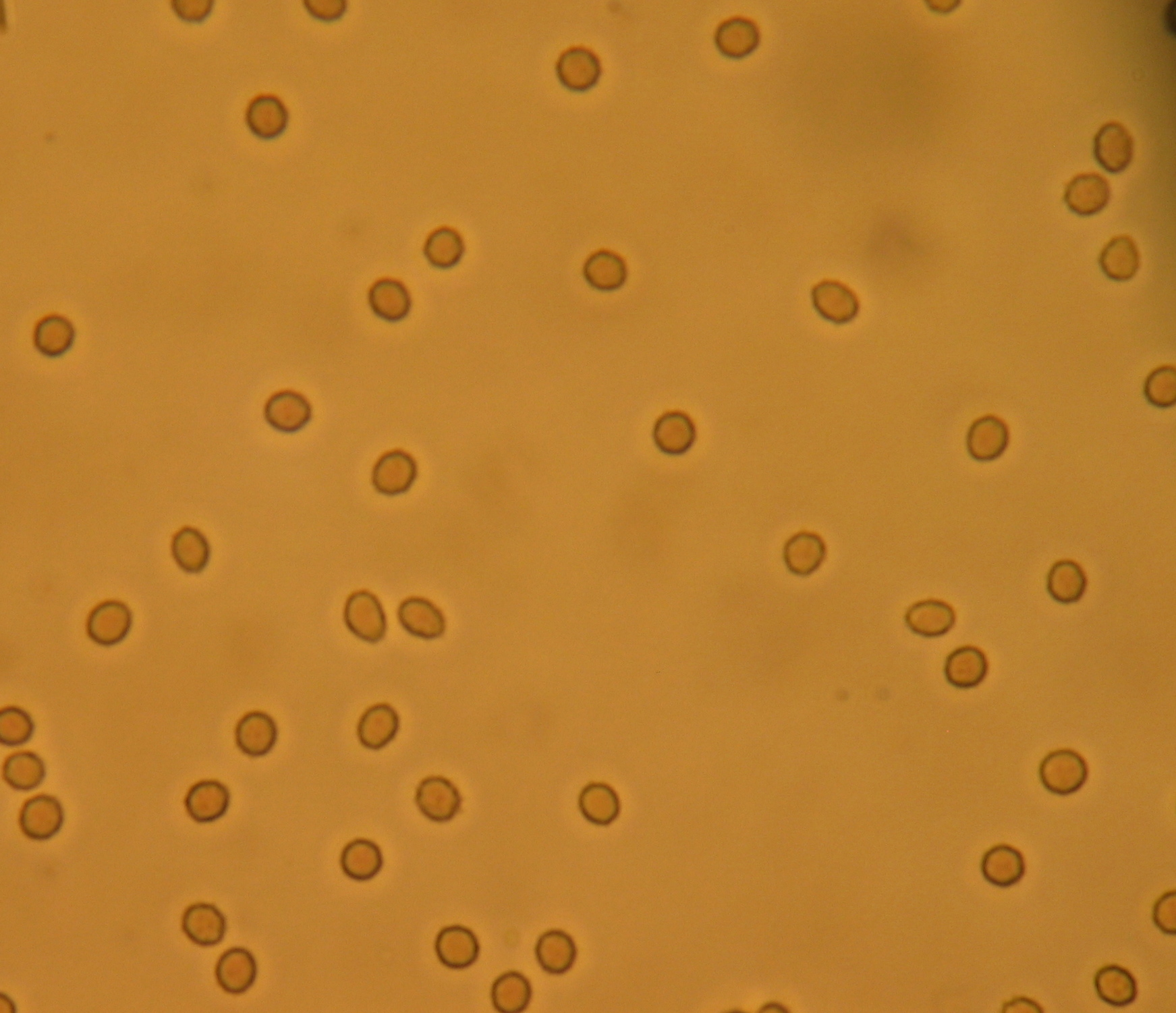
Microscopic hematuria: Red blood cells in a urine sample seen under the microscope.

Microhematuria, also called microscopic hematuria (both usually abbreviated as MH), is a medical condition in which urine contains small amounts of blood; the blood quantity is too low to change the color of the urine (otherwise, it is known as gross hematuria). While not dangerous in itself, it may be a symptom of kidney disease, such as IgA nephropathy or sickle cell trait, or bladder pathology which should be monitored by a doctor.

The American Urological Association (AUA) recommends a definition of microscopic hematuria as three or more red blood cells per high-power microscopic field in urinary sediment from two of three properly collected urinalysis specimens.

Microhematuria is usually asymptomatic, and as of 2001 there were medical guidelines on how to handle asymptomatic microhematuria (AMH) so as to avoid problems such as overtreatment or misdiagnosis. In 2025, American Urological Association guidelines for microhematuria were updated.

== See also ==
- Proteinuria
- Hematuria
- Myoglobinuria
- Hemoglobinuria
