= High-power field =

Area visible through the objective of a microscope

A high-power field (HPF), when used in relation to microscopy, references the field of view under the maximum magnification power of the objective being used. Often, this represents a 400-fold magnification when referenced in scientific papers.

== Area ==
Area per high-power field for some microscope types:

- Olympus BX50, BX40 or BH2 or AO: 0.096 mm^{2}
- AO with 10x eyepiece: 0.12 mm^{2}
- Olympus with 10x eyepiece: 0.16 mm^{2}
- Nikon Eclipse E400 with 10x eyepiece and 40x objective: 0.25mm^{2}
- Leitz Ortholux: 0.27 mm^{2}
- Leitz Diaplan: 0.31 mm^{2}

== Examples of usage ==
The area provides a reference unit, for example in reference ranges for urine tests.

Used for grading of soft tissue tumors: Grading, usually on a scale of I to III, is based on the degree of differentiation, the average number of mitoses per high-power field, cellularity, pleomorphism, and an estimate of the extent of necrosis (presumably a reflection of rate of growth). Mitotic counts and necrosis are the most important predictors.

The following grading is part of classification of breast cancer:

Mitotic count per 10 high-power fields (HPFs)
| Area per HPF | | | | | Score |
| 0.096 mm^{2} | 0.12 mm^{2} | 0.16 mm^{2}> | 0.27 mm^{2} | 0.31 mm^{2} | Score |
|---|---|---|---|---|---|
| 0-3 | 0-4 | 0-5 | 0-9 | 0-11 | 1 |
| 4-7 | 5-8 | 6-10 | 10-19 | 12-22 | 2 |
| >7 | >8 | >10 | >19 | >22 | 3 |
