= Non-gonococcal urethritis =

Inflammation of the urethra

- Specialty: Urology

Nongonococcal urethritis (NGU) is inflammation of the urethra that is not caused by gonorrheal infection.

For treatment purposes, doctors usually classify infectious urethritis in two categories: gonococcal urethritis, caused by gonorrhea, and nongonococcal urethritis (NGU).

== Symptoms and signs ==
The symptoms of urethritis can include pain or a burning sensation upon urination (dysuria), a white/cloudy discharge and a feeling that one needs to pass urine frequently. For men, the signs and symptoms are discharge from the penis, burning or pain when urinating, itching, irritation, or tenderness. In women, the signs and symptoms are discharge from vagina, burning or pain when urinating, anal or oral infections, abdominal pain, or abnormal vaginal bleeding, which may be an indication that the infection has progressed to Pelvic Inflammatory Disease.

NGU is transmitted by touching the mouth, penis, vagina or anus by penis, vagina or anus of a person who has NGU.

NGU is more common in men than women. Men may have a discharge (strange liquid) from the penis, pain when urinating, and itching, irritation or tenderness around the opening of the penis. Women might not have any symptoms and may not know they have NGU until severe problems occur. Women might have discharge from the vagina, burning or pain when urinating, pain in the abdominal (stomach) area, or bleeding from the vagina that is not from a monthly period. (This may be an sign that NGU has become worse and turned into Pelvic Inflammatory Disease, or PID).

== Causes ==
There are many causes of NGU. This is in part due to the large variety of organisms living in the urinary tract. Ureaplasma urealyticum and Mycoplasma genitalium are some of the culprits. NGU is also associated with reactive arthritis, in which the triad of arthritis, conjunctivitis, and urethritis is seen.

=== Bacterial ===
The most common bacterial cause of NGU is Chlamydia trachomatis, but it can also be caused by Ureaplasma urealyticum, Haemophilus vaginalis, Mycoplasma genitalium, Mycoplasma hominis, Neisseria meningitidis, Gardnerella vaginalis, Acinetobacter lwoffii, Acinetobacter calcoaceticus, E.coli, and Haemophilus influenzae.

=== Viral ===
Viruses are estimated to cause a smaller portion of NGU cases compared to bacteria. Herpes simplex viruses (HSV-1 and HSV-2) are estimated to cause between 2% and 10% of cases. Adenoviruses account for approximately 2–4% of NGU cases, often presenting with a triad of symptoms including meatus, urethritis, and conjunctivitis.

=== Fungi ===
Candida Albicans

=== Parasitic ===
Parasitic causes include Trichomonas vaginalis (rare).

=== Noninfectious ===
Urethritis can be caused by mechanical injury (from a urinary catheter or a cystoscope), or by an irritating chemical (antiseptics or some spermicides).

== Diagnosis ==
It has been easy to test for the presence of gonorrhea by viewing a Gram stain of the urethral discharge under a microscope: The causative organism is distinctive in appearance; however, this works only with men because other non-pathogenic gram-negative microbes are present as normal flora of the vagina in women. Thus, one of the major causes of urethritis can be identified (in men) by a simple common test, and the distinction between gonococcal and non-gonococcal urethritis arose for this reason.

Non-gonococcal urethritis (NGU) is diagnosed if a person with urethritis has no signs of gonorrhea bacteria on laboratory tests.

In men, the most frequent cause of NGU (15%-55% of cases) is Chlamydia trachomatis.

=== Idiopathic urethritis or non-specific urethritis ===
Historically, the terms idiopathic urethritis (US English) or non-specific urethritis (British English) have been used as synonyms for nongonococcal urethritis. "Idiopathic" and "non-specific" are medical term meaning "specific cause has not been identified", and in this case refers to the detection of urethritis, and the testing for but found negative of gonorrhea. In this sense, the most likely cause of NSU is a chlamydia infection.

However, the term NSU is sometimes distinguished and used to mean that both gonorrhea and chlamydia have been ruled out. Thus, depending on the sense, chlamydia can either be the most likely cause or have been ruled out, and frequently detected organisms are Ureaplasma urealyticum and Mycoplasma hominis.

However, in 20-50% of cases, a specific cause for urethritis can't be identified, in which case a diagnosis of idiopathic urethritis is a diagnosis of exclusion.

== Treatment ==
Treatment is based on the prescription and use of the proper antibiotics depending on the strain of the ureaplasma.

Because of its multi-causative nature, initial treatment strategies involve using a broad range antibiotic that is effective against chlamydia (such as doxycycline). It is imperative that both the patient and any sexual contacts be treated. Women infected with the organisms that cause NGU may develop pelvic inflammatory disease. If symptoms persist, follow-up with a urologist may be necessary to identify the cause.

According to a study, tinidazole used with doxycycline or azithromycin may cure NGU better than when doxycycline or azithromycin is used alone.

If left untreated, complications include epididymitis and infertility. Consistent and correct use of latex condoms during sexual activity greatly reduces the likelihood of infection.

== See also ==
- Bacterial vaginosis
