= Biliary pseudolithiasis =

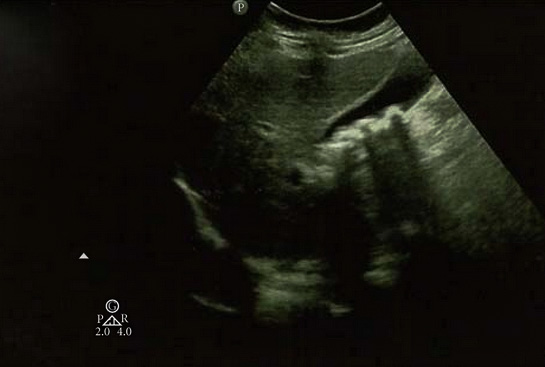
- Biliary pseudolithiasis as seen on ultrasonography. The gallbladder contains gallstone mimics resulting from ceftriaxone therapy.

Biliary pseudolithiasis is an unusual complication of ceftriaxone where the drug complexes with calcium and mimics gallstones. It is reversed when ceftriaxone administration is stopped. It was first described in 1988 by Schaad et al. as "reversible ceftriaxone-associated biliary pseudolithiasis". Ceftriaxone has been frequently associated with biliary sludge or biliary pseudolithiasis in subsequent reports. Ceftriaxone is excreted primarily through the urine, but also through the bile, up to 40% of its excretion, with concentrations in the bile 20-150 times higher than in the serum. It forms a calcium salt in the gallbladder, which can exceed its solubility and create precipitates that resemble gallstones on ultrasonography. The incidence of pseudolithiasis in children treated with ceftriaxone is up to 25%, but most patients are asymptomatic. Risk factors for biliary pseudolithiasis include age greater than 24 months, gram-negative sepsis, high doses of ceftriaxone, hypercalcemia, surgery, and decreased bile flow/increased ceftriaxone excretion in bile. Conservative management with serial ultrasounds is recommended until the "stones" completely resolve. If associated with ceftriaxone, it resolves on average about 2 weeks after the ceftriaxone is stopped.

== Ceftriaxone ==
Ceftriaxone sold under the brand name Rocephin, is a third-generation cephalosporin antibiotic used for the treatment of a number of bacterial infections. These include middle ear infections, endocarditis, meningitis, pneumonia, bone and joint infections, intra-abdominal infections, skin infections, urinary tract infections, gonorrhea, and pelvic inflammatory disease. It is also sometimes used before surgery and following a bite wound to try to prevent infection. Ceftriaxone can be given by injection into a vein or into a muscle.

== See also ==
- Biliary sludge
