= Epidemiology of gonorrhoea =

Gonorrhoea is a sexually transmitted infection (STI) caused by the bacterium Neisseria gonorrhoeae.

The World Health Organization (WHO) estimated that, in 2016, the global incidence rate was 20 per 1000 women and 26 per 1000 men, totaling 86.9 million new gonococcal infections among people between 15 and 49 years old.

== Canada ==
As of 2018, gonorrhoea was the second most commonly reported STI in Canada. Its incidence rate has been rising since 1997.

Incidence rate among men was consistently higher than that among women (70.2 per 100,000 versus 40.6 per 100,000 in 2015). It was also increasing faster among men than women (85.2% versus 39.5% in 2010–2015). People between 15 and 29 years old had the highest rate. Geographically, the highest gonorrhoea rates in 2015 were found in the Northwest Territories, Nunavut and Yukon.

== Nordic countries ==
Notified cases of gonorrhea among men in Nordic countries (2000–2020)

Notified cases of gonorrhea among women in Nordic countries (2000–2020)

In Nordic countries, gonorrhoea affects mainly young people below the age of 30. Infections are more common in men than in women. Nearly half of the reported cases of gonorrhoea are attributed to men who have sex with men (MSM).

Greenlandic women have the highest incidence rate. In contrast to the other Nordic countries, in Greenland, the numbers of cases among women and among men are almost equally high. Incidence rates are significantly lower in the other Nordic countries. However, cases are rising in Denmark, Iceland, Norway and Sweden. The Faroe Islands has relatively few cases.

== United Kingdom ==
Rates of selected STI diagnoses among England residents accessing sexual health services by ethnicity and STI, 2022

In England, there were 82,592 diagnoses of gonorrhoea in 2022, an increase of 50.3% compared to 2021 (54,961). The number of gonorrhoea diagnoses in 2022 was the largest annual number reported since records began.

Diagnoses were increasing in people of all ages in England, but the rise was highest among young people aged 15 to 24 years. This trend was also detected in Scotland.

== United States ==
Sexually transmitted disease surveillance 2020

Sexually transmitted disease surveillance 2020 published by the Centers for Disease Control and Prevention (CDC) showed that, in 2020, a total of 677,769 cases of gonorrhea were reported to the CDC, a 45 percent increase from 2016,making it the second most common notifiable sexually transmitted infection in the United States for that year. Rates of reported gonorrhea have increased 111% since the historic low in 2009. During 2019–2020, the overall rate of reported gonorrhea increased 5.7%; rates increased among both males and females and in three regions of the United States (Midwest, Northeast, and South); rates of reported gonorrhea increased in 36 states and two US territories.

Since 2013, rates have been higher among men compared to women, likely reflecting cases identified in both men who have sex with men (MSM) and men who have sex with women only. Although there are limited data available on sexual behaviors of persons reported with gonorrhea at the national level, enhanced data from jurisdictions participating in a sentinel surveillance system, the STD Surveillance Network (SSuN), suggest that about a third of gonorrhea cases occurred among MSM in 2020. During 2019–2020, rates increased among both men and women, but increases were greater among women (15%) compared to men (6.6%) which may reflect differences in diagnosing and reporting of cases among MSM in 2020. As extragenital infections are often asymptomatic and are likely identified by screening, diagnoses among MSM may have been reduced in 2020 due to the effect of the COVID-19 pandemic on screening coverage.

Gonorrhoea can quickly develop resistance to antibiotics used to treat infection, and in 2020, about half of all infections were estimated to be resistant to at least one antibiotic. Since 2010, almost all circulating strains in the United States, based on gonococcal isolates collected through sentinel surveillance in the Gonococcal Isolate Surveillance Project (GISP), remain susceptible to ceftriaxone, the primary treatment for gonorrhea; only 0.1% of isolates displayed elevated ceftriaxone minimum inhibitory concentrations (MICs) in 2020. In 2020, 5.8% of isolates had elevated azithromycin MICs; the proportion was higher among MSM compared to men who have sex with women only (9.2% vs 4.3%).
