= Urethritis =

Inflammation of the urethra

- Specialty: Urology

Urethritis is the inflammation of the urethra. The most common symptoms include painful or difficult urination and urethral discharge. It is a commonly treatable condition usually caused by infection with bacteria. This bacterial infection is often sexually transmitted, but not in every instance; it can be idiopathic, for example. Some incidence of urethritis can appear asymptomatic as well.

== Symptoms and signs ==
Symptoms vary based on the cause of the diseases. For infectious causes of urethritis, symptoms may start a few weeks to several months after infection. Non-infectious causes of urethritis commonly show symptoms after a few days. Common symptoms include painful urination, continuous urge to urinate, itching, and urethral discharge. Additional symptoms vary based on sex. Men may experience blood in the urine or semen, itching, tenderness, or swelling of the penis, enlarged lymph nodes in the groin area, and/or pain with intercourse or ejaculation. Women may experience abdominal pain, pelvic pain, pain with intercourse, or vaginal discharge. Non-gonococcal urethritis typically does not have noticeable symptoms in women, however, the infection can spread to parts of the reproductive system.

=== Complications ===
Serious, yet rare complications associated with Neisseria gonorrhoeae, may include penile edema, abscessed tissue surrounding the urethra, urethral strictures such as scarring, and penile lymphangitis. If left untreated, the bacteria that cause non-gonococcal urethritis can lead to various complications. In males, complications can lead to epididymitis, reactive arthritis, conjunctivitis, skin lesions, and discharge. In females, complications can lead to pelvic inflammatory disease, chronic pelvic pain, vaginitis, mucopurulent cervicitis, and miscarriages.

== Causes ==
The disease is classified as either gonococcal urethritis, caused by Neisseria gonorrhoeae, or non-gonococcal urethritis (NGU), most commonly caused by Chlamydia trachomatis, which is accounted for 20-50% of routinely tested cases. NGU, sometimes called nonspecific urethritis (NSU), has both infectious and noninfectious causes.

Other causes include:

- Mycoplasma genitalium: second most common cause accounting for 15-20% of non-gonococcal urethritis
- Trichomonas vaginalis: accounts for 2-13% of cases in the US; infection is mainly asymptomatic in most cases
- Adenoviridae
- Uropathogenic Escherichia coli (UPEC)
- Herpes simplex virus
- Cytomegalovirus
- Reactive arthritis: urethritis is part of the triad of reactive arthritis, which includes arthritis, urethritis, and conjunctivitis.
- Ureaplasma urealyticum
- Methicillin-resistant Staphylococcus aureus
- Group B streptococcus
- Irritation of the genital area: for example catheter-induced, physical activity, tight clothing or soaps
- Fungal urethritis in immunosuppressed individual
- Menopause

== Diagnosis ==
Urethritis is usually diagnosed through collecting history on the individual and through a physical examination. In women, urethritis can be diagnosed with a number of tests including: urine test, blood test, vaginal culture, cytoscopy, or a nucleic acid test. Women will also have abdominal and pelvic exams to check for urethral discharge, and tenderness of the lower abdomen or urethra.

In men, urethritis is diagnosed by at least one of the following: mucopurulent or purulent urethral discharge on examination, ≥ 2 white blood cells per oil immersion field from a Gram stain of a urethral swab, or positive leukocyte esterase and/or ≥10 white blood cells per high power field of the first-void urine. Men who meet the criteria for urethritis commonly get nucleic acid amplification testing for Chlamydia trachomatis and Neisseria gonorrhoeae to determine the type of urethritis. Men will have an exam on the abdomen, bladder area, penis, and scrotum. Additionally, a digital rectal examination of the prostate may be used if rectal pain is reported or if the individual is of older age.

== Prevention ==
Primary prevention can be accomplished by the reduction of modifiable risk factors that increase the likelihood of developing urethritis. These factors include, but are not limited to, sexual intercourse (particularly unprotected intercourse) and genital irritation from contact with tight clothing, physical activity, and various irritants such as soap, lotion and spermicides.

Bacterial infections leading to gonococcal and non-gonococcal urethritis can be prevented by:

- sexual abstinence
- use of barrier contraception, such as condoms
- pre-exposure vaccination: HPV and Hepatitis B vaccines
- reducing number of sexual partners

Chlorhexidine is an antibacterial agent that covers a wide spectrum of gram-positive and gram-negative bacteria. Rinsing with 15 ml of a 0.12% or 10 ml of 0.2% chlorhexidine solution for 30 seconds produced large and prolonged reductions in salivary bacterial counts within 7 hours of its use. One hypothesis in 2010 posed the potential use of chlorhexidine rinsing before oral sex as a prevention strategy of recurrent non-gonococcal urethritis caused by bacteria entering the urethra from oral cavity following "insertive oral intercourse", particularly in men. However, actual clinical studies are yet to be carried out in order to prove this hypothesis.

== Treatment ==
Antimicrobials are generally the drug of choice for gonococcal and non-gonococcal infections. The CDC in 2015 suggests using a dual therapy that consists of two antimicrobials that have different mechanisms of action would be an effective treatment strategy for urethritis and it could also potentially slow down antibiotic resistance.

A variety of drugs may be prescribed based on the cause of urethritis:

- Gonococcal urethritis (caused by N. gonorrhoeae): The CDC recommends administering an injection dose of ceftriaxone 250 mg intramuscularly and oral dose of azithromycin 1g simultaneously. Cefixime 400 mg oral single dose can be used as an alternative if ceftriaxone is not available.
- Non-gonococcal urethritis (caused by Chlamydia trachomatis): The CDC recommends administering an oral single dose of azithromycin 1g or a 7-day course of doxycycline 100 mg orally twice daily.'
  - Alternative treatments can also be used when the above options are not available:
    - Erythromycin base 500 mg orally four times daily for 7 days
    - Erythromycin ethylsuccinate 800 mg orally four times daily for 7 days
    - Levofloxacin 500 mg orally once daily for 7 days
    - Ofloxacin 300 mg orally twice daily for 7 days

Treatment for both gonococcal and non-gonococcal urethritis is suggested to be given under direct observation in a clinic or healthcare facility in order to maximize compliance and effectiveness.

For non-medication management, proper perineal hygiene should be stressed. This includes avoiding use of vaginal deodorant sprays and proper wiping after urination and bowel movements. Sexual intercourse should be avoided at least 7 days after completion of treatment (and until symptoms resolves, if present). Past and current sexual partners should also be assessed and treated.

Individuals displaying persistence or recurrence of symptoms should be instructed for possible re-evaluation. Although there is no standard definition, persistent urethritis is defined as urethritis that has failed to display improvement within the first week of initial therapy. Additionally, recurrent urethritis is defined as urethritis reappearing within 6 weeks after a previous episode of non-gonococcal urethritis. If recurrent symptoms are supported by microscopic evidence of urethritis, then re-treatment is appropriate. The following treatment recommendations are limited and based on clinical experience, expert opinions and guidelines for recurrent or persistent non-gonococcal urethritis:

- If doxycycline was prescribed as initial therapy, give azithromycin 500 mg or 1 gram for the first day, then give azithromycin 250 mg once daily for 4 days plus metronidazole 400 – 500 mg twice daily for 5 days
- If azithromycin was prescribed as initial therapy, then give doxycycline 100 mg twice daily for 7 days plus metronidazole 400 – 500 mg twice daily for 5 – 7 days
- Moxifloxacin 400 mg orally once daily for 7 – 14 days can be given with use of caution, if macrolide-resistant M. genitalium infection is demonstrated

Appropriate treatment for these individuals may require further referral to a urologist if symptoms persist after initial treatment.

== Epidemiology ==
Urethritis is one of the most common sexually transmitted infections found in men. Gonorrhea and chlamydia are the main pathogens causing urethritis. Health organizations break down the rate of urethritis based on its etiology. The estimated global prevalence of gonorrhoea is 0.9% in women and 0.7% in men. An estimated 87 million new infections of gonorrhoea occurred in 2016. Low-income countries have the highest prevalence of gonorrhoea. Gonorrhea is more commonly seen in males than in females and infection rates are higher in adolescents and young adults.

The estimated global prevalence of chlamydia, which is the most common cause of non-gonococcal urethritis, is 3.8% in women and 2.7% in men. An estimated 127 million new chlamydia cases occurred in 2016. Upper-middle income countries had the highest prevalence of chlamydia. The rate of chlamydia is around two times higher in females than in males. Rates are also higher among adolescents and young adults.
