= Alder's sign =

- Differential diagnosis: Appendicitis, Tubo-ovarian pathology

Alder's sign, also known as Klein's sign, is a medical sign used to differentiate between appendicitis and tubo-ovarian pathology.
