= Gonorrhea =

Sexually transmitted infection

- Other names: Gonorrhoea, gonococcal infection, gonococcal urethritis, the clap
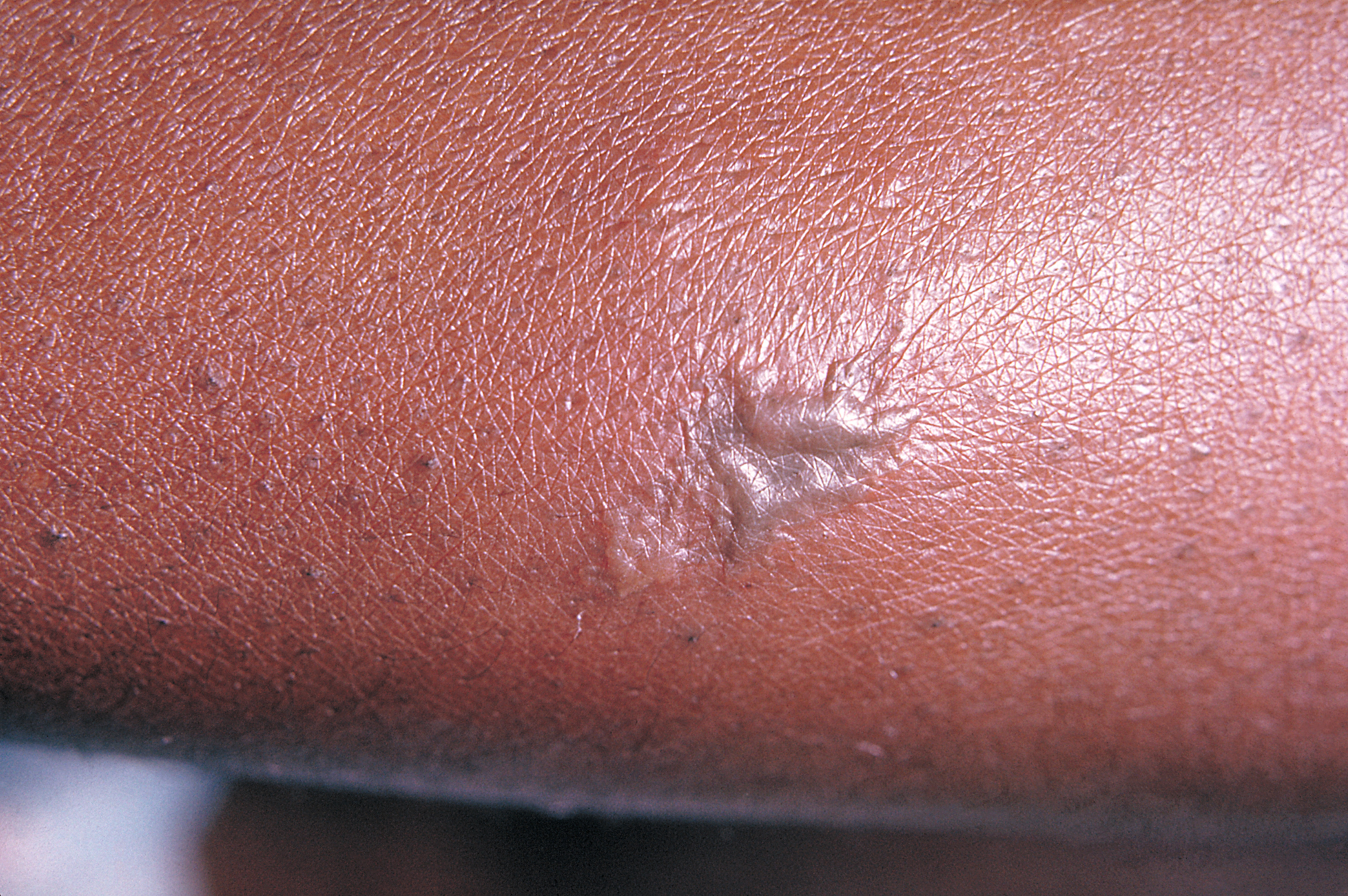
- Gonococcal lesion on the skin
- Pronunciation: /ˌɡɒn.əˈri.ə/
- Specialty: Infectious disease
- Symptoms: None, burning with urination, vaginal discharge, discharge from the penis, pelvic pain, testicular pain
- Complications: Pelvic inflammatory disease, inflammation of the epididymis, septic arthritis, endocarditis, meningitis
- Causes: Neisseria gonorrhoeae typically sexually transmitted
- Diagnostic method: Testing the urine, urethra in males; vagina or cervix in females, throat, or rectum
- Prevention: Condoms, having sex with only one person who is uninfected, not having sex, meningococcal B vaccines
- Treatment: Ceftriaxone by injection and azithromycin by mouth
- Frequency: 0.8% (women), 0.6% (men)

Gonorrhea or gonorrhoea, colloquially known as the clap, is a sexually transmitted infection (STI) caused by the bacterium Neisseria gonorrhoeae. Infection may involve the genitals, mouth, or rectum.

Gonorrhea is spread through sexual contact with an infected person, or from a mother to a child during birth. Infected males may experience pain or burning with urination, discharge from the penis, or testicular pain. Infected females may experience burning with urination, vaginal discharge, vaginal bleeding between periods, or pelvic pain. Complications in females include pelvic inflammatory disease and in males include inflammation of the epididymis. Many of those infected, however, have no symptoms. If untreated, gonorrhea can spread to joints or heart valves. Globally, gonorrhea affects about 0.8% of women and 0.6% of men. An estimated 33 to 106 million new cases occur each year. In 2015, it caused about 700 deaths.

Diagnosis is by testing the urine, urethra in males, vagina or cervix in females. It can be diagnosed by testing a sample collected from the throat or rectum of individuals who have had oral or anal sex, respectively. Testing all women who are sexually active and less than 25 years of age each year as well as those with new sexual partners is recommended; the same recommendation applies in men who have sex with men (MSM).

Gonorrhea can be prevented with the use of condoms, having sex with only one person who is uninfected, and by not having sex. Certain vaccines originally designed to protect against infection caused by related bacteria, meningococcus serotype B, have been found to provide some protection against gonorrhea. Treatment is usually with ceftriaxone by injection and azithromycin by mouth. Resistance has developed to many previously used antibiotics and higher doses of ceftriaxone are occasionally required.

== Signs and symptoms ==
Copy Clinical photograph of a cutaneous gonococcal lesion in a patient with disseminated Neisseria gonorrhoeae infection.

Gonorrhea infections of mucosal membranes can cause swelling, itching, pain, and the formation of pus. The time from exposure to symptoms is usually between two and 14 days, with most symptoms appearing between four and six days after infection, if they appear at all. Both men and women with infections of the throat may experience a sore throat, though such infection does not produce symptoms in 90% of cases. Other symptoms may include swollen lymph nodes around the neck. Either sex can become infected in the eyes or rectum if these tissues are exposed to the bacterium, which can lead to pain with bowel movements, rectal discharge, or constipation.

=== Women ===
Half of women with gonorrhea are asymptomatic but the other half experience vaginal discharge, lower abdominal pain, or pain with sexual intercourse associated with inflammation of the uterine cervix. Common medical complications of untreated gonorrhea in women include pelvic inflammatory disease which can cause scars to the fallopian tubes and result in later ectopic pregnancy among those women who become pregnant.

=== Men ===
Most infected men with symptoms have inflammation of the penile urethra associated with a burning sensation during urination and discharge from the penis. In men, discharge with or without burning occurs in half of all cases and is the most common symptom of the infection. This pain is caused by a narrowing and stiffening of the urethral lumen. The most common medical complication of gonorrhea in men is inflammation of the epididymis. Gonorrhea is also associated with increased risk of prostate cancer.

=== Infants ===
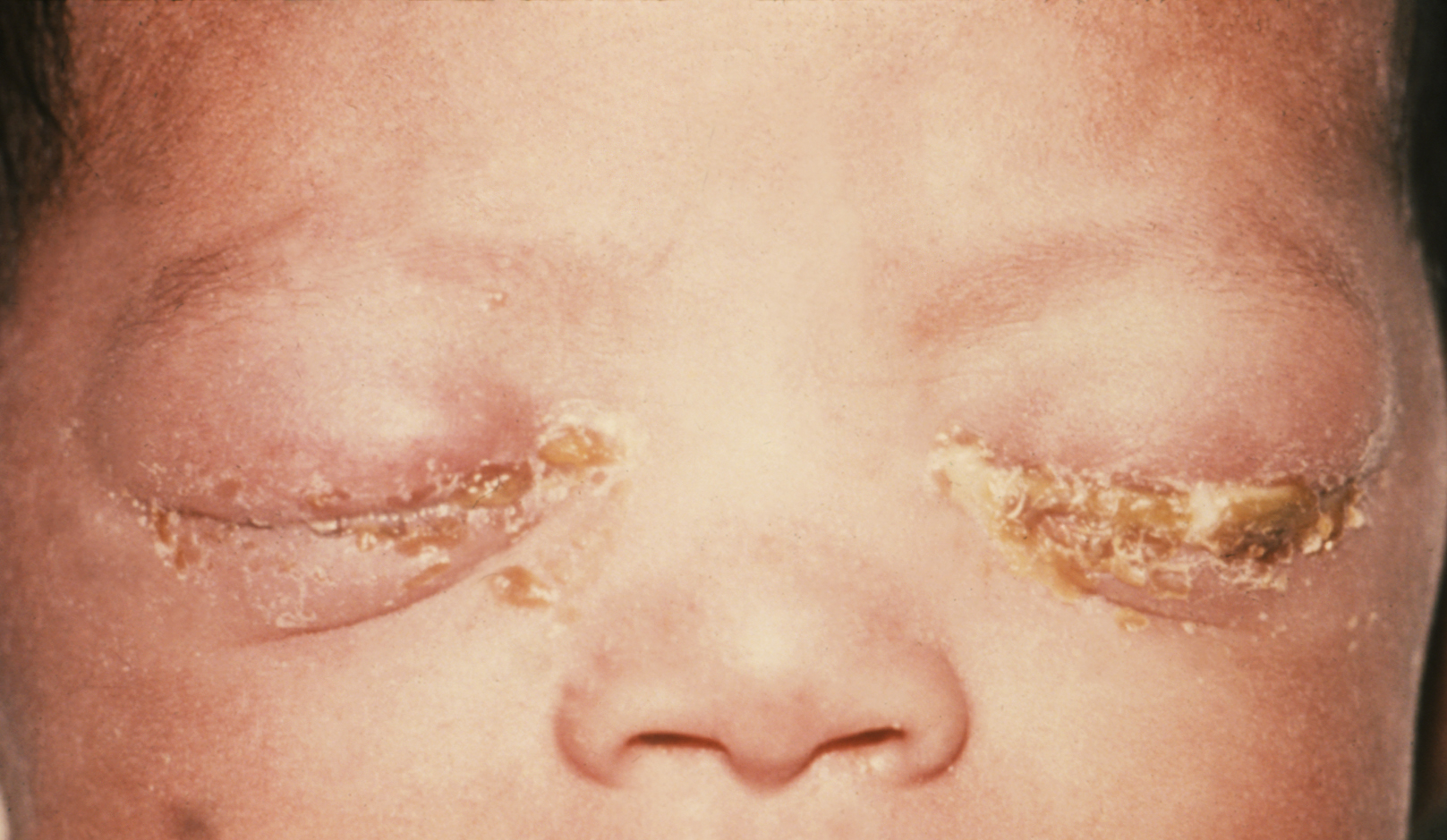
An infant with gonorrhea of the eyes

If left untreated, gonococcal ophthalmia neonatorum can develop in 28% of infants born to women with gonorrhea.

=== Spread ===
If left untreated, gonorrhea can spread from the original site of infection and infect and damage the joints, skin, and other organs. Indications of this can include fever, skin rashes, sores, and joint pain and swelling. In advanced cases, gonorrhea may cause a general feeling of tiredness similar to other infections. It is also possible for an individual to have an allergic reaction to the bacteria, in which case any appearing symptoms will be greatly intensified. Very rarely it may settle in the heart, causing endocarditis, or in the spinal column, causing meningitis. Both are more likely among individuals with suppressed immune systems, however.

== Cause ==
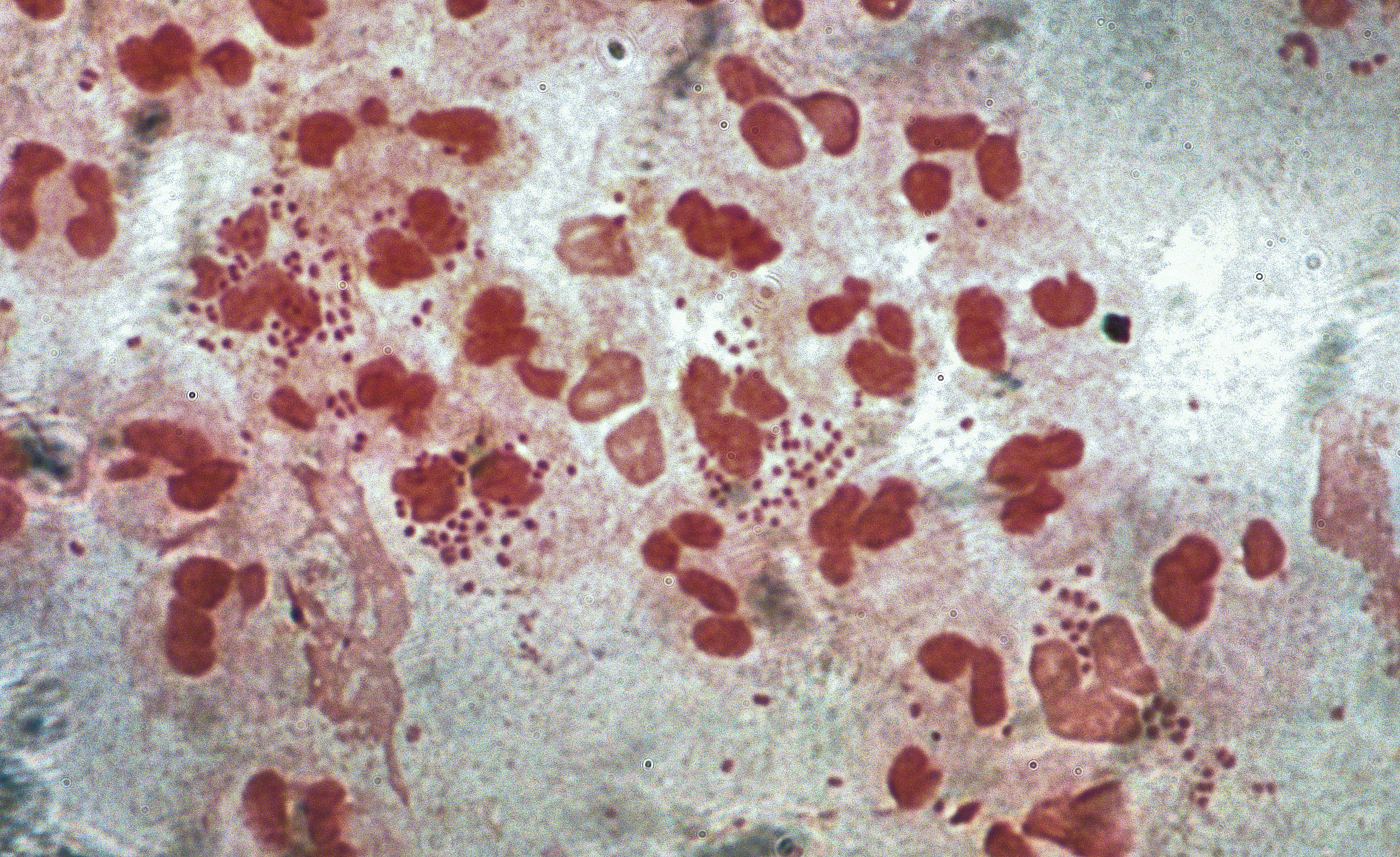
Neisseria gonorrhoeae in pus from a case of gonorrhoea in a man (Gram stain)

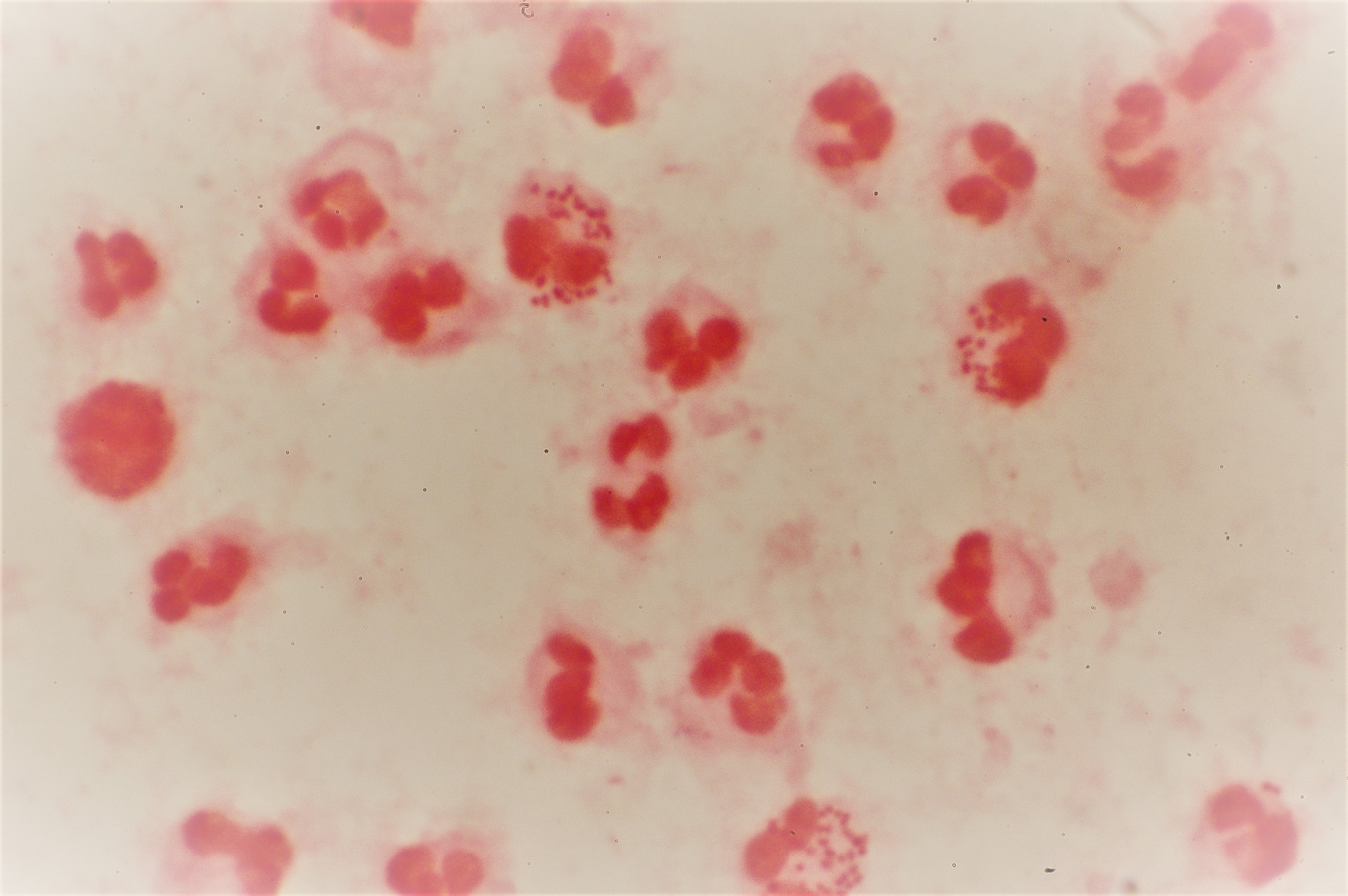
Gram-stained pus from a urethral discharge showing Gram-negative, intracellular diplococci

Gonorrhea is caused by the bacterium Neisseria gonorrhoeae. Previous infection does not confer immunity – a person who has been infected can become infected again by exposure to someone who is infected. Infected persons may be able to infect others repeatedly without having any signs or symptoms of their own.

=== Spread ===
The infection is usually spread from one person to another through vaginal, oral, or anal sex. Men have a 20% risk of getting the infection from a single act of vaginal intercourse with an infected woman. The risk for men who have sex with men (MSM) is higher. Insertive MSM may get a penile infection from anal intercourse, while receptive MSM may get anorectal gonorrhea. Women have a 60–80% risk of getting the infection from a single act of vaginal intercourse with an infected man.

A mother may transmit gonorrhea to her newborn during childbirth; when affecting the infant's eyes, it is referred to as ophthalmia neonatorum. It may be able to spread through the objects contaminated with body fluid from an infected person. The bacteria typically does not survive long outside the body, typically dying within minutes to hours.

==== Risk factors ====
It is discovered that sexually active women younger than 25 and men who have sex with men are at increased risk of getting gonorrhea.

Other risk factors include:

- Having a new sex partner
- Having a sex partner who has other partners
- Having more than one sex partner
- Having had gonorrhea or another sexually transmitted infection

== Complications ==
Untreated gonorrhea can lead to major complications, such as:

- Infertility in women. Gonorrhea can spread into the uterus and fallopian tubes, causing pelvic inflammatory disease (PID). PID can result in scarring of the tubes, greater risk of pregnancy complications and infertility, and can be fatal, particularly in the immunocompromised. PID requires immediate treatment.
- Infertility in men. Gonorrhea can cause a small, coiled tube in the rear portion of the testicles where the sperm ducts are located (epididymis) to become inflamed (epididymitis). Untreated epididymitis can lead to infertility.
- Infection that spreads to the joints and other areas of the body. The bacterium that causes gonorrhea can spread through the bloodstream and infect other parts of the body, including the joints. Fever, rash, skin sores, joint pain, swelling and stiffness are possible results.
- Increased risk of HIV/AIDS. Having gonorrhea increases the susceptibility to infection with human immunodeficiency virus (HIV), the virus that leads to AIDS. People who have both gonorrhea and HIV (untreated by anti-retroviral therapy) are able to pass both diseases more readily to their partners.
- Complications in babies. Babies who contract gonorrhea from their mothers during birth can develop blindness, sores on the scalp and infections.

== Diagnosis ==
=== Laboratory diagnosis ===
The laboratory diagnosis of gonorrhea involves identifying Neisseria gonorrhoeae in specimens collected from sites of suspected infections, such as the urethra, cervix, rectum, pharynx, or conjunctiva. Historically, diagnosis relied on bacterial culture, in which samples are placed on specialized growth media and incubated under controlled conditions. Colonies suspected to be N. gonorrhoeae are then evaluated using laboratory tests that distinguish it from other related bacteria.

The primary detection methods for Neisseria gonorrhoeae are nucleic acid amplification tests, which are the most sensitive techniques available. Other methods of detection include microscopy and culture.

Nucleic acid amplification tests (NAATs) have become the preferred diagnostic method because they can detect very small amounts of bacterial genetic material and can be performed on a variety of specimen types. These molecular tests generally have greater sensitivity than culture and do not depend on the survival of the organism during transport to the lab. To reduce the risk of inaccurate results, some testing strategies use a second genetic target or an alternative molecular assay to confirm positive findings, particularly in populations where gonorrhea is uncommon.

Despite the widespread use of molecular testing, cultures continue to play an important role in public health and clinical practice. Isolates obtained through culture can be tested for antimicrobial susceptibility which allows labs to monitor emerging drug resistance and investigate possible treatment failures. Culture based methods also support epidemiological studies that track the spread and genetic diversity of gonococcal strains. For both culture and molecular techniques, the use of appropriate controls and quality assurance procedures is essential for maintaining diagnostic accuracy.

=== Prevention ===
Prevention requires a combination of behavioral, clinical, and public health interventions. Using latex barriers (e.g., condoms or dental dams) during sex and by limiting sexual partners is one of the most effective methods for reducting transmission. Condoms and dental dams should be used during oral and anal sex as well. Spermicides, vaginal foams, and douches are not effective methods for transmission prevention. Routine screening of individuals at increased risk can identify asymptomatic infections, allowing treatment before the infection is spread to others or causes complications. Rapid diagnosis, appropriate antibiotic therapy, and treatment of recent sexual partners are also important because they can help interrupt ongoing transmission within sexual networks. Public health efforts that promote sexual health education, improve access to testing and treatment, and strengthen surveillance of antibiotic resistant strains further support gonorrhea control.

==== Vaccine ====
A vaccine against N. gonorrhoeae is becoming more necessary due to the growing incidence of cases, increasing antimicrobial resistance, and its impact on reproductive health. There are problems that have hampered vaccine development including: the absence of immunity post-infection, exclusively human hosts, and antigenic and phase variation of potential vaccine targets. Currently, there are several N. gonorrhoeae vaccines in development, including an outer membrane vesicle vaccine. This includes the NGoXIM, the native OMV, and Bexsero/4CMenB vaccine candidates, which are all in the late clinical stages of development.

Another challenge in vaccine development is the production of antibodies against the gonococcal reduction-modifiable protein (Rmp). Rmp interfere with the activity of antibodies targeting other surface antigens such as porins and lipooligosaccharide which can reduce protective immune responses.

The creation of a vaccine for N. gonorrhoeae has several potential public health impacts. In one estimate, a vaccine for the heterosexual population given before sexual activity occurs showed that the prevalence of N. gonorrhoeae could be reduced by up to 90% after 20 years. In 2023, the FDA gave fast-track designation to a gonorrhoea vaccine candidate from GSK . NHS England has also launched the world's first vaccination program against gonorrhea, using a vaccine against Neisseria meningitidis which was found to be partially effective against N. gonorrhoeae

=== Treatment ===
Currently, the CDC recommends a single dose of the injectable cephalosporin, ceftriaxone, as the first line of defense against gonococcal infections. Individuals weighing less than 150 kg are typically prescribed a ceftriaxone concentration of 500 mg, while individuals who weigh over 150 kg are typically prescribed a dose of 1 g. Although ceftriaxone is not the only cephalosporin that has been effective at treating gonorrhoeae, it is the most advantageous. In the event of a cephalosporin allergy, the CDC recommends a dual treatment of gentamicin and azithromycin. Each drug should be administered as a single dose, with the gentamicin entering intramuscularly at a concentration of 240 mg, along with 2 g of azithromycin taken orally. If an individual is not allergic to cephalosporins but ceftriaxone is unavailable, an alternative treatment is a single dose of 800 mg cefixime consumed orally. In all of these cases, combination therapy and co-treatment for chlamydia is recommended, as simultaneous infections are common.

As Neisseria gonorrhoeae continues to develop resistance to several classes of antibiotics, there is a need for alternative treatments. The usual antibiotics, ceftriaxone and gentamicin, must be injected, making an effective oral medication an interesting topic of research. A new, as of 2025, antimicrobial drug, gepotidacin, which is taken by mouth, has a different mechanism of action than ceftriaxone. Rather than binding penicillin-binding proteins and inhibiting peptidoglycan cross-linking, this drug specifically inhibits bacterial DNA replication. When compared with ceftriaxone, gepotidacin was 1.4% more effective.

==== Antibiotic resistance ====
Antibiotic resistance in gonorrhea was first identified in the 1940s. Gonorrhea was treated with penicillin, but doses had to be progressively increased to remain effective. By the 1970s, penicillin-and tetracycline-resistant gonorrhea emerged in the Pacific Basin. These resistant strains then spread to Hawaii, California, the rest of the United States, Australia and Europe. Fluoroquinolones were the next line of defense, but soon resistance to this antibiotic emerged, as well. Since 2007, standard treatment has been third-generation cephalosporins, such as ceftriaxone, which are considered to be our "last line of defense". Recently, a high-level ceftriaxone-resistant strain of gonorrhea called H041 was discovered in Japan. Lab tests found it to be resistant to high concentrations of ceftriaxone, as well as most of the other antibiotics tested. Within N. gonorrhoeae, genes exist that confer resistance to every single antibiotic used to cure gonorrhea, but thus far, they do not coexist within a single gonococcus. However, because of N. gonorrhoeae's high affinity for horizontal gene transfer, antibiotic-resistant gonorrhea is seen as an emerging public health threat.

Before 2007, fluoroquinolones were a common treatment recommendation for gonorrhoeae. The CDC stopped suggesting these systemic bacterial agents once a resistant strain of N. gonorrhoeae emerged in the United States. The removal of fluoroquinolones as a potential treatment left cephalosporins as the only viable antimicrobial option for gonorrhea treatment. Wary of further gonococcal resistance, the CDC's recommendations shifted in 2010 to a dual therapy strategy—cephalosporin with either azithromycin or doxycycline. Despite these efforts, resistant N. gonorrhoeae had been reported in five continents by 2011, further limiting treatment options and recommendations. Antimicrobial resistance is not universal and N. gonorrhoeae strains in the United States continue to respond to a combination regimen of ceftriaxone and azithromycin.

As Neisseria gonorrhoeae continues to develop resistance to several classes of antibiotics, there is a need for alternative treatments. The usual antibiotics, ceftriaxone and gentamicin, must be injected, making an effective oral medication an interesting topic of research. A new, as of 2025, antimicrobial drug, gepotidacin, which is taken by mouth, has a different mechanism of action than ceftriaxone. Rather than binding penicillin-binding proteins and inhibiting peptidoglycan cross-linking, this drug specifically inhibits bacterial DNA replication. When compared with ceftriaxone, gepotidacin was 1.4% more effective.

Gepotidacin works by targeting DNA gyrase and topoisomerase IV. Inhibiting their normal activity in DNA replication and chromosome maintenance induces single-strand DNA breaks. Gepotidicin is more resistant to target-mediated antibiotic resistance than fluoroquinolones because it targets both enzymes equally.

== Screening ==
The United States Preventive Services Task Force (USPSTF) recommends screening for gonorrhea in women at increased risk of infection, which includes all sexually active women younger than 25 years. Extragenital gonorrhea and chlamydia are highest in men who have sex with men (MSM). Additionally, the USPSTF also recommends routine screening in people who have previously tested positive for gonorrhea or have multiple sexual partners and individuals who use condoms inconsistently, provide sexual favors for money, or have sex while under the influence of alcohol or drugs.

Screening for gonorrhea in women who are (or intend to become) pregnant, and who are found to be at high risk for sexually transmitted infections, is recommended as part of prenatal care in the United States.

== Prevention ==
As with most sexually transmitted infections, the risk of infection can be reduced significantly by the correct use of condoms, not having sex, or can be removed almost entirely by limiting sexual activities to a mutually monogamous relationship with an uninfected person.

Those previously infected are encouraged to return for follow up care to make sure that the infection has been eliminated. In addition to the use of phone contact, the use of email and text messaging have been found to improve the re-testing for infection.

Newborn babies coming through the birth canal are given erythromycin ointment in the eyes to prevent blindness from infection. The underlying gonorrhea should be treated; if this is done then usually a good prognosis will follow.

=== Vaccines ===
As of 2014, a vaccine for gonorrhea had been developed that was effective in mice. Development of a vaccine has been complicated by the ongoing evolution of resistant strains and antigenic variation (the ability of N. gonorrhoeae to disguise itself with different surface markers to evade the immune system).

As N. gonorrhoeae is closely related to N. meningitidis and they have 80–90% homology in their genetic sequences, some cross-protection is feasible with meningococcal vaccines. A study published in 2017 showed that the MeNZB group B meningococcal vaccine provided partial protection against gonorrhea, with vaccine efficiency calculated to be 31%. In June 2023, GlaxoSmithKline won fast-track designation from the Food and Drug Administration for its vaccine candidate against gonorrhea.

In August 2025 the NHS began a gonorrhea vaccine program in England to provide 4CMenB (brand name Bexsero) to high-risk populations, marking the first time that a vaccine has been available specifically to prevent gonorrhea infections. Bexsero is primarily used to protect against meningococcal B disease but has also been shown to provide up to 40% protection against gonorrhea. The vaccination program is expected to prevent up to 100,000 cases of gonorrhea over ten years and save the NHS more than £7.9m.

== Treatment ==
=== Antibiotics ===
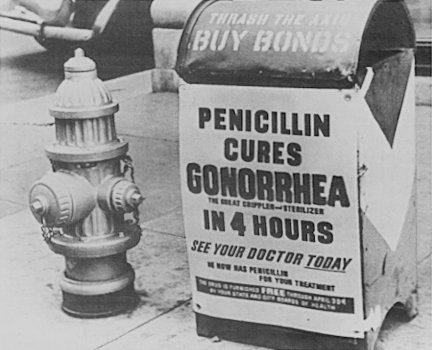
Penicillin entered mass production in 1944 and revolutionized the treatment of several venereal diseases.

Antibiotics are used to treat gonorrhea infections. As of 2016, both ceftriaxone by injection and azithromycin by mouth are most effective. However, due to increasing rates of antibiotic resistance, local susceptibility patterns must be taken into account when deciding on treatment. Ertapenem is a potential effective alternative treatment for ceftriaxone-resistant gonorrhea.

Adults may have eyes infected with gonorrhea and require proper personal hygiene and medications. Addition of topical antibiotics have not been shown to improve cure rates compared to oral antibiotics alone in treatment of eye infected gonorrhea. For newborns, erythromycin ointment is recommended as a preventative measure for gonococcal infant conjunctivitis.

Infections of the throat can be especially problematic, as antibiotics have difficulty becoming sufficiently concentrated there to destroy the bacteria. This is amplified by the fact that pharyngeal gonorrhoea is mostly asymptomatic, and gonococci and commensal Neisseria species can coexist for long time periods in the pharynx and share anti-microbial resistance genes. Accordingly, an enhanced focus on early detection (i.e., screening of high-risk populations, such as men who have sex with men, PCR testing should be considered) and appropriate treatment of pharyngeal gonorrhea is important.

Zoliflodacin (Nuzolvence) and gepotidacin (Blujepa) were approved for medical use in the United States in December 2025, for the treatment of uncomplicated urogenital gonorrhea.

=== Sexual partners ===
It is recommended that sexual partners be tested and potentially treated. One option for treating sexual partners of people infected is patient-delivered partner therapy (PDPT), which involves providing prescriptions or medications to the person to take to their partner without the health care provider's first examining them.

The United States' Centers for Disease Control and Prevention (CDC) currently recommend that individuals who have been diagnosed and treated for gonorrhea avoid sexual contact with others until at least one week past the final day of treatment in order to prevent the spread of the bacterium.

=== Antibiotic resistance ===
Many antibiotics that were once effective including penicillin, tetracycline, and fluoroquinolones are no longer recommended because of high rates of resistance. Resistance to cefixime has reached a level such that it is no longer recommended as a first-line agent in the United States, and if it is used a person should be tested again after a week to determine whether the infection still persists. Public health officials are concerned that an emerging pattern of resistance may predict a global epidemic. In 2016, the WHO published new guidelines for treatment, stating "There is an urgent need to update treatment recommendations for gonococcal infections to respond to changing antimicrobial resistance (AMR) patterns of N. gonorrhoeae. High-level resistance to previously recommended quinolones is widespread and decreased susceptibility to the extended-spectrum (third-generation) cephalosporins, another recommended first-line treatment in the 2003 guidelines, is increasing and several countries have reported treatment failures."

== Prognosis ==
Disability-adjusted life year for gonorrhea per 100,000 inhabitants: no data <13 13–26 26–39 39–52 52–65 65–78 / 78–91 91–104 104–117 117–130 130–143 >143

Gonorrhea if left untreated may last for weeks or months with higher risks of complications. One of the complications of gonorrhea is systemic dissemination resulting in skin pustules or petechia, septic arthritis, meningitis, or endocarditis. This occurs in between 0.6 and 3% of infected women and 0.4 and 0.7% of infected men.

In men, inflammation of the epididymis, prostate gland, and urethra can result from untreated gonorrhea. In women, the most common result of untreated gonorrhea is pelvic inflammatory disease. Other complications include inflammation of the tissue surrounding the liver, a rare complication associated with Fitz-Hugh–Curtis syndrome; septic arthritis in the fingers, wrists, toes, and ankles; septic abortion; chorioamnionitis during pregnancy; neonatal or adult blindness from conjunctivitis; and infertility. Men who have had a gonorrhea infection have an increased risk of getting prostate cancer.

== Epidemiology ==
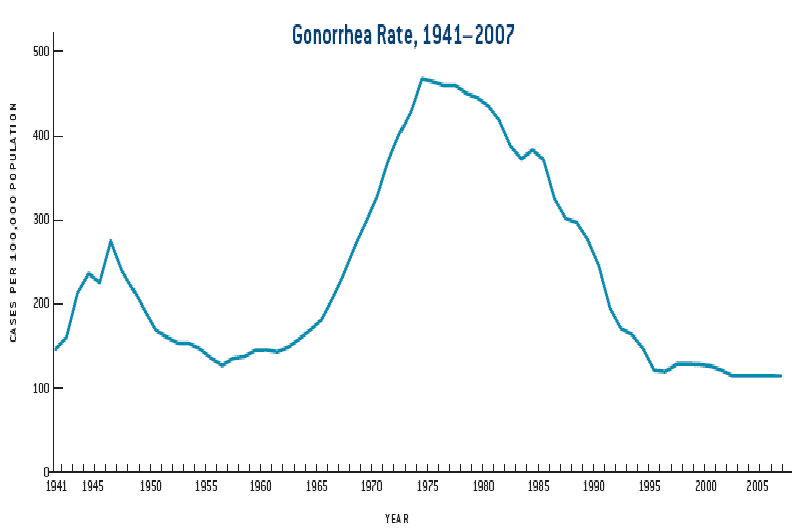
Gonorrhea rates, United States, 1941–2007

About 88 million cases of gonorrhea occur each year, out of the 448 million new cases of curable STI each year – that also includes syphilis, chlamydia and trichomoniasis. The prevalence was highest in the African region, the Americas, and Western Pacific, and lowest in Europe. In 2013, it caused about 3,200 deaths, up from 2,300 in 1990.

In the United Kingdom, 196 per 100,000 males 20 to 24 years old and 133 per 100,000 females 16 to 19 years old were diagnosed in 2005. In 2013, the CDC estimated that more than 820,000 people in the United States get a new gonorrheal infection each year. Fewer than half of these infections are reported to CDC. In 2011, 321,849 cases of gonorrhea were reported to the CDC. After the implementation of a national gonorrhea control program in the mid-1970s, the national gonorrhea rate declined from 1975 to 1997. After a small increase in 1998, the gonorrhea rate has decreased slightly since 1999. In 2004, the rate of reported gonorrheal infections was 113. 5 per 100,000 persons.

In the US, it is the second-most-common bacterial sexually transmitted infections; chlamydia remains first. According to the CDC African Americans are most affected by gonorrhea, accounting for 69% of all gonorrhea cases in 2010.

The World Health Organization warned in 2017 of the spread of untreatable strains of gonorrhea, following analysis of at least three cases in Japan, France and Spain, which survived all antibiotic treatment.

== History ==
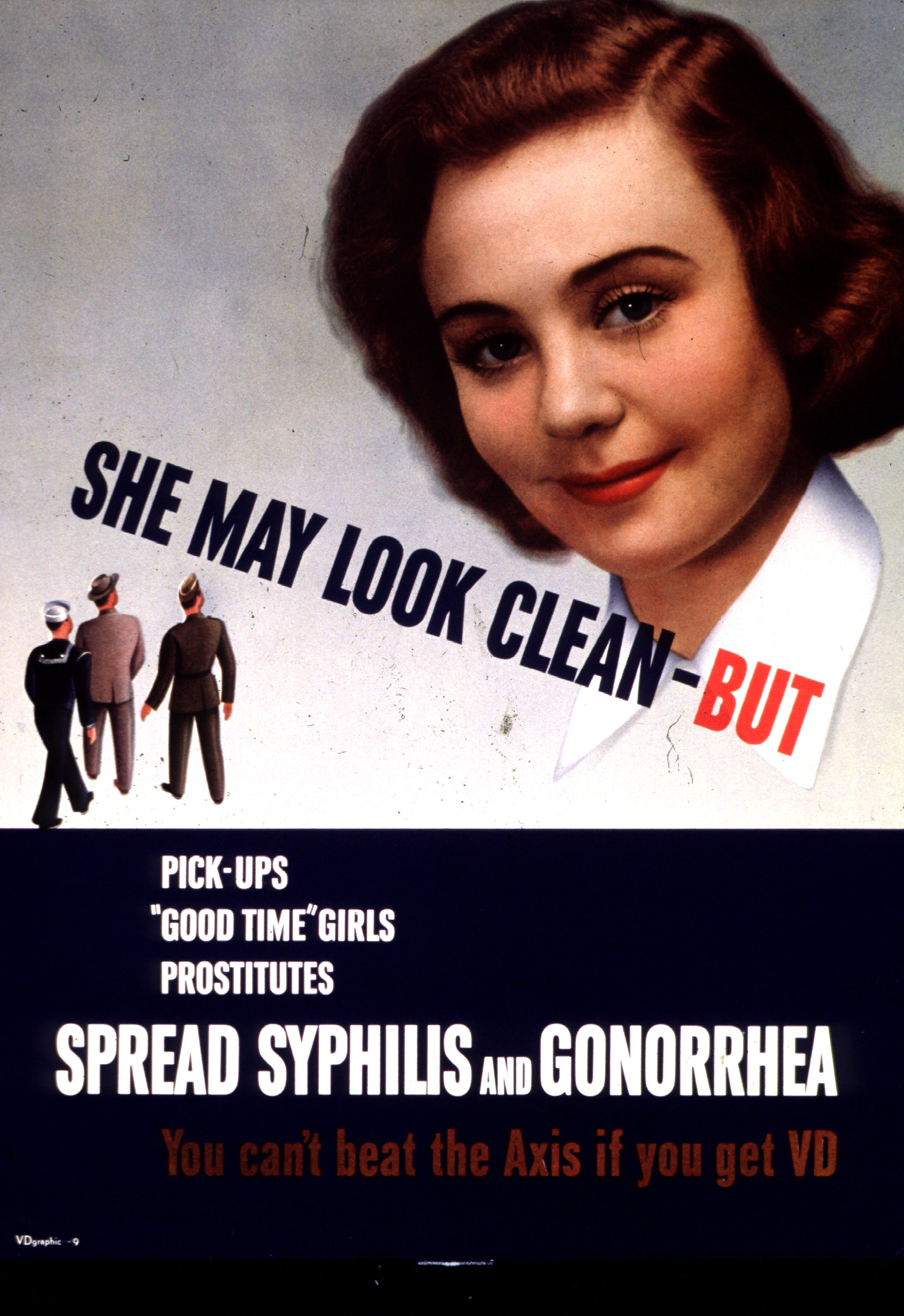
During World War II, the U.S. government used posters to warn military personnel about the dangers of gonorrhea and other sexually transmitted infections.

Some scholars translate the biblical terms zav (for a male, Hebrew: זָב) and zavah (for a female, זָבָה) as gonorrhea.

In the 16th century mercury was used as a treatment for gonorrhea for sailors at sea. Surgeons' tools on board the recovered English warship the Mary Rose included a syringe that, according to some, was used to inject the mercury via the urinary meatus into crewmen with gonorrhea. The name "the clap", in reference to the disease, is recorded as early as the sixteenth century, referring to a medieval red-light district in Paris, Les Clapiers. Translating to "The rabbit holes", it was so named for the small huts in which prostitutes worked.

Silver nitrate was one of the widely used drugs in the 19th century. However, it became replaced by Protargol. Arthur Eichengrün invented this type of colloidal silver, which was marketed by Bayer from 1897 onward. The silver-based treatment was used until the first antibiotics came into use in the 1940s.

The exact time of onset of gonorrhea as prevalent disease or epidemic cannot be accurately determined from the historical record. One of the first reliable notations occurs in the Acts of the English Parliament which, in 1161, passed a law to reduce the spread of "the perilous infirmity of burning". The symptoms described are consistent with, but not diagnostic of, gonorrhea. A similar decree was passed by Louis IX in France in 1256, replacing regulation with banishment. Similar symptoms were noted at the siege of Acre by Crusaders.

Coincidental to, or dependent on, the appearance of a gonorrhea epidemic, several changes occurred in European medieval society. Cities hired public health doctors to treat affected patients without right of refusal. Pope Boniface VIII rescinded the requirement that physicians complete studies for the lower orders of the Catholic priesthood.

Medieval public health physicians in the employ of their cities were required to treat prostitutes infected with the "burning", as well as lepers and other epidemic patients. After Pope Boniface completely secularized the practice of medicine, physicians were more willing to treat a sexually transmitted infection.
