= Gepotidacin =

Antibacterial drug

Clinical data
- Trade names: Blujepa
- Other names: GSK2140944
- AHFS/Drugs.com: Monograph
- MedlinePlus: a625059
- License data: US DailyMed: Gepotidacin
- Routes of administration: By mouth
- ATC code: J01XX13 (WHO)

Legal status
- Legal status: US: ℞-only

Identifiers
- IUPAC name: (2R)-2-({4-[(3,4-Dihydro-2H-pyrano[2,3-c]pyridin-6-ylmethyl)amino]-1-piperidinyl}methyl)-1,2-dihydro-3H,8H-2a,5,8a-triazaacenaphthylene-3,8-dione
- CAS Number: 1075236-89-3
- DrugBank: DB12134
- ChemSpider: 34982930
- UNII: DVF0PR037D; 5P7X0H2O6B
- KEGG: D10878; D10879
- ECHA InfoCard: 100.249.088

Chemical and physical data
- Formula: C_{24}H_{28}N_{6}O_{3}
- Molar mass: 448.527 g·mol^{−1}
- 3D model (JSmol): Interactive image
- SMILES: c1cc(=O)n2c3c1ncc(=O)n3[C@@H](C2)CN4CCC(CC4)NCc5cc6c(cn5)OCCC6
- InChI: InChI=1S/C24H28N6O3/c31-22-4-3-20-24-29(22)15-19(30(24)23(32)13-27-20)14-28-7-5-17(6-8-28)25-11-18-10-16-2-1-9-33-21(16)12-26-18/h3-4,10,12-13,17,19,25H,1-2,5-9,11,14-15H2/t19-/m1/s1; Key:PZFAZQUREQIODZ-LJQANCHMSA-N

Gepotidacin, sold under the brand name Blujepa, is an antibiotic medication used for the treatment of urinary tract infection or uncomplicated urogenital gonorrhea. Gepotidacin is a triazaacenaphthylene bacterial type II topoisomerase inhibitor. It is used as the salt gepotidacin mesylate, and is taken by mouth.

Gepotidacin was approved for medical use in the United States in March 2025. The US Food and Drug Administration considers it to be a first-in-class medication. It is the first triazaacenaphthylene antibiotic to be approved in the US.

== Medical uses ==
Gepotidacin is indicated for the treatment of females aged twelve years of age and older weighing at least 40 kilograms (88 lb) with uncomplicated urinary tract infections (uUTI) caused by Escherichia coli, Klebsiella pneumoniae, Citrobacter freundii complex, Staphylococcus saprophyticus, and Enterococcus faecalis.

In December 2025, the indication for gepotidacin was expanded to include the treatment of uncomplicated urogenital gonorrhea in people who weigh at least 99 pounds (45 kg).

== Pharmacology ==
=== Mechanism of action ===
Gepotidacin's primary mechanism of action involves inhibiting bacterial DNA replication, specifically targeting DNA gyrase (topoisomerase II) and topoisomerase IV. These enzymes are vital for bacterial processes such as replication, transcription, and cell division, as they regulate the topological state of DNA during these activities. Gepotidacin binds to the GyrA subunit of DNA gyrase and the ParC subunit of topoisomerase IV. Research has shown that this interaction occurs within a pocket formed by these subunits, located between the scissile DNA bonds. By binding in this region, gepotidacin inhibits the activity of these enzymes, thereby impairing bacterial replication. This mechanism of action is distinct from other antibiotic classes, including fluoroquinolones.

=== Pharmacokinetics ===
Gepotidacin is rapidly absorbed orally, reaching peak plasma concentrations (t_{max}) after approximately 2.0 hours. In adults with uncomplicated urinary tract infections (uUTI) and normal renal function, the mean steady-state maximum concentration (C_{max}) is 4.2 mcg/mL, and the area under the concentration-time curve over 12 hours AUC(0-12) is 22.8 mcg*hour/mL following a 1500 mg dose every 12 hours. Systemic exposure (C_{max} and AUC) increases proportionally with dose. Accumulation of approximately 40% occurs and achieves a steady state by day 3. The absolute bioavailability is about 45%, and standard and moderate fat meals did not significantly affect its absorption.

Gepotidacin's pharmacokinetics were found to be generally consistent across different ages, sexes, races, and body weights during modeling and simulation. Gepotidacin has a mean steady-state volume of distribution (Vss) of 172.9 liters and is 25-41% bound to plasma proteins. It has a terminal elimination half-life of approximately 9.3 hours and a total clearance of 33.4 L/hour. The primary metabolic pathway involves CYP3A4, with a minor metabolite (M4, ~11% of circulating drug). The co-administration of other drugs can influence gepotidacin levels. Strong inhibitors of CYP3A4 can increase gepotidacin exposure, whereas strong inducers of CYP3A4 can decrease it. Additionally, gepotidacin, at high concentrations, has shown the potential to increase the exposure of certain other drugs, including digoxin and midazolam. In vitro studies indicate gepotidacin can inhibit specific drug transporters, but the clinical significance of these findings requires further evaluation. Excretion is mainly fecal (~52%, 30% unchanged) and urinary (~31%, 20% unchanged), with the latter being the major route for absorbed drug.

Renal impairment leads to elevated gepotidacin exposure, with the degree of increase directly linked to the severity of kidney dysfunction. This effect is particularly pronounced in patients with end-stage renal disease undergoing hemodialysis. Additionally, impaired kidney function decreases urinary excretion of the drug, which may necessitate dosage adjustments in severe cases to ensure safe and effective treatment. Severe hepatic impairment also elevates gepotidacin exposure, while moderate hepatic impairment did not show a clinically relevant effect during clinical trials.

== Synthesis ==
The synthesis of gepotidacin is reported in a review article. The route is shown as follows:

First, 2-chloro-6-methoxy-3-nitropyridine and 2-aminopropane-1,3-diol undergo nucleophilic aromatic substitution (S_{N}Ar) to form a diol, which is then protected by 2,2-dimethoxypropane to form a ketal intermediate. The intermediate is reduced with hydrogen catalyzed by Pd/C to afford an amine, which then immediately goes through substitution with ethyl bromoacetate. The resulting compound is treated with NaH, and is then oxidized with MnO_{2} to form the pyrazinone ring. The ketal is deprotected with aqueous HCl to regenerate the diol, and is then treated with methanesulfonic anhydride and triethylamine to form the final ring of the tricyclic core. The resulting compound goes through substitution with tert-butyl piperidin-4-ylcarbamate, acidic deprotection of the amino group, and chiral preparative HPLC to give the enantio-pure penultimate amine intermediate. Finally, a reductive amination is performed, and the product is treated with HCl in diethyl ether to form gepotidacin as a hydrochloride. This route consists of 11 steps, with 8 steps aimed at the formation of the tricyclic core.

== Society and culture ==
=== Legal status ===
In October 2024, gepotidacin was granted priority review by the US Food and Drug Administration (FDA) for the treatment of uncomplicated urinary tract infections.

Gepotidacin was approved for medical use in the United States in March 2025.

The FDA granted the application for gepotidacin fast track, qualified infectious disease product, and priority review designations for the uncomplicated urogenital gonorrhea indication. The FDA approval for Blujepa was granted to GSK.

=== Names ===
Gepotidacin is the international nonproprietary name. Gepotidacin is sold under the brand name Blujepa.

== Research ==
Gepotidacin is being studied for the treatment of antibiotic resistant Neisseria gonorrhoeae (gonorrhea) infection.
