= Perihepatitis =

Liver disease

Perihepatitis is inflammation of the serous or peritoneal coating of the liver.

Perihepatitis is often caused by one of the inflammatory disorders of the female upper genital tract, known collectively as pelvic inflammatory disease.

== Presentation ==
Some patients have sharp right upper abdominal quadrant pain. One of the complications of perihepatitis is Fitz-Hugh–Curtis syndrome.

== Etiology ==
Common bacterial causes for this disease are Chlamydia trachomatis and Neisseria gonorrhoeae.
