= Cervical motion tenderness =

- Differential diagnosis: PID, Ectopic pregnancy

Cervical motion tenderness or cervical excitation is a sign elicited during a gynecological pelvic examination that is suggestive of pelvic pathology. It is classically present in cases of pelvic inflammatory disease (PID) and ectopic pregnancy, and can be useful in differentiating PID from appendicitis. It's a sign of peritoneal irritation in the pelvis. It is also known colloquially as chandelier sign because the pain elicited during a bimanual pelvic exam can be so excruciating that the patient might involuntarily reach up as if to grasp a ceiling-mounted chandelier.

== See also ==
- Cervix
