= Fitz-Hugh–Curtis syndrome =

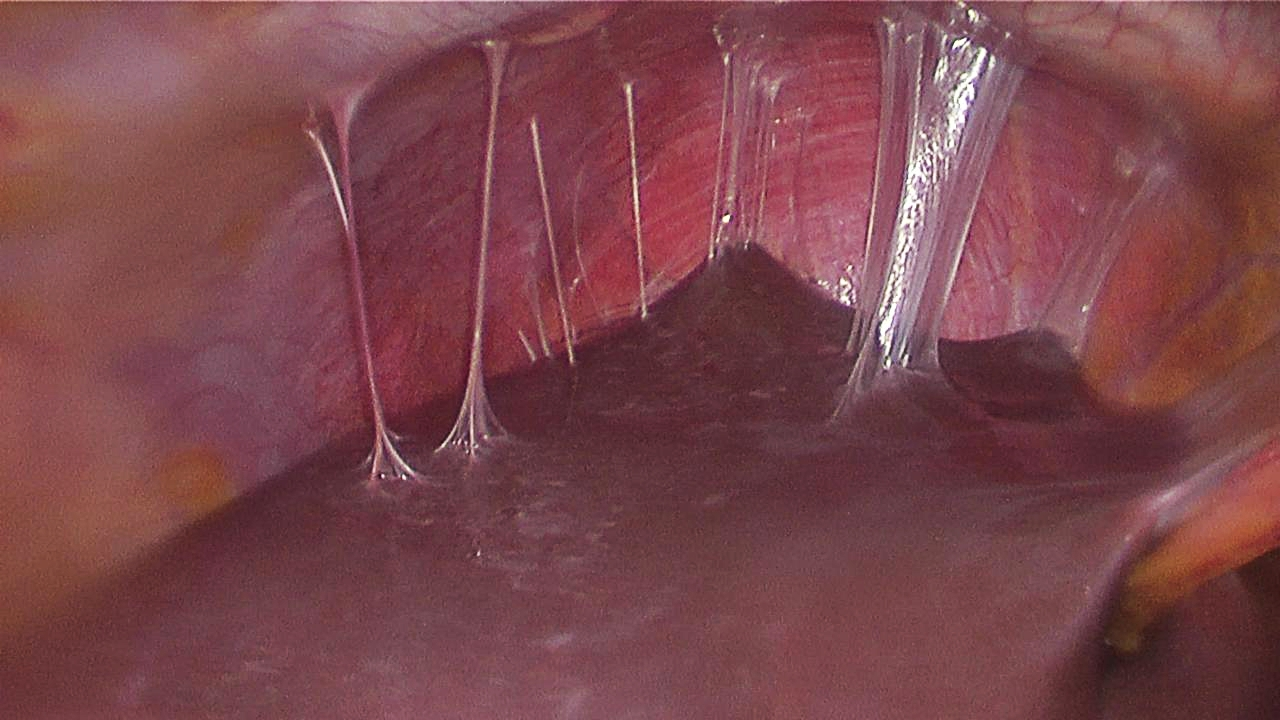
- Perihepatic adhesions

Fitz-Hugh–Curtis syndrome is a rare complication of pelvic inflammatory disease (PID) involving liver capsule inflammation leading to the formation of adhesions presenting with the clinical syndrome of right upper quadrant (RUQ) pain.

== History ==
Fitz-Hugh–Curtis syndrome, or perihepatitis, was first described by Carlos Stajano in 1920, who found adhesions between the liver capsule and the abdominal wall in patients suffering from gonococcal infections.

The condition is named after the two physicians, Thomas Fitz-Hugh Jr. and Arthur Hale Curtis, who further studied the syndrome in the 1930s. They noted the classic "violin string adhesions" in female patients presenting with RUQ abdominal pain. Both Fitz-Hugh and Curtis regularly found these adhesions during laparotomy in patients with the clinical syndrome of RUQ with concern for gallbladder pathology; however, no abdominal pathology was found in these patients but residual gonococcal tubal changes were often noted.

== Pathophysiology ==
Fitz-Hugh–Curtis syndrome occurs almost exclusively in women, though it can be seen in males rarely. It is complication of pelvic inflammatory disease (PID) caused by Chlamydia trachomatis (Chlamydia) or Neisseria gonorrhoeae (Gonorrhea) though other bacteria such as Bacteroides, Gardnerella, E. coli and Streptococcus have also been found to cause Fitz-Hugh–Curtis syndrome on occasion. Fitz-Hugh–Curtis syndrome was originally studied solely as a complication of PID secondary to Gonorrhea, but studies have now shown that Chlamydia is the most common causal pathogen. Fitz-Hugh–Curtis syndrome occurs in 5-15% of patients with PID.

The pathogens of PID spread either spontaneous secondary to an ascending infection through the fallopian tubes, lymphatically, or hematogenous. Inflammation then causes scar tissue to form on Glisson's capsule, a thin layer of connective tissue surrounding the liver. This inflammation and scarring then leads to the characteristic RUQ pain.

== Presentation ==
The major symptom and signs include an acute onset of RUQ abdominal pain aggravated by breathing, coughing or laughing, which may also present with referred pain to the right shoulder. There is usually also tenderness on palpation of the right upper abdomen and tenderness to percussion of the lower ribs which protect the liver. Patients may also report fevers, malaise, back pain, pelvic pain, dyspareunia, vaginal discharge, and dysuria.

Patients are most often women of childbearing age. There are a number of risk factors for the development of Fitz-Hugh–Curtis syndrome, these include having multiple sexual partners, history of sexually transmitted disease, history of PID, use of an intrauterine device, use of a vaginal douche, and being under the age of 25.

== Differential diagnosis ==
The signs and symptoms of Fitz-Hugh–Curtis syndrome greatly overlap with numerous other abdominal and pelvic pathologies. It is important for practitioners to perform a thorough history and physical as the differential for the symptoms of Fitz-Hugh–Curtis syndrome include cholecystitis, appendicitis, hepatitis, pregnancy, pyelonephritis, renal colic, pleuritic causes such as pneumonia, pulmonary embolism, and pleurisy, among many others.

== Diagnosis and workup ==
The workup for Fitz-Hugh–Curtis syndrome at presentation begins with ruling out pregnancy or an ectopic pregnancy with a pregnancy test, this can also help guide antibiotic therapy if indicated to prevent teratogens.

Radiographic studies are often indicated to rule out other thoracic, abdominal, and pelvic pathologies. Chest and abdominal radiographs may be indicated to rule out pulmonary pathologies and to assess for free air under the diaphragm in the case of intestinal perforation. Abdominal and pelvic ultrasounds are critical to rule out common causes of RUQ pain such as cholelithiasis, cholecystitis, and abdominal/pelvic abscesses. Computed tomography (CT) scan should be obtained in the case that the clinical suspicion for appendicitis is high. In cases of Fitz-Hugh–Curtis syndrome, the CT scan may show increased blood flow to the liver capsule secondary to the inflammation.

Liver function tests (LFTs) are often obtained is these patients as part of the initial workup, since Fitz-Hugh–Curtis syndrome does not involve direct damage to the liver, LFTs will be normal or only slightly elevated.

After ruling out other concerning pathologies if suspicion is high, the workup for Fitz-Hugh–Curtis syndrome involves testing for sexually transmitted diseases (Chlamydia and Gonorrhea) with nucleic acid amplification tests (NAATs) from a cervical swab sample. If indicated, urethral, rectal, and/or pharyngeal swabs may be obtained as well.

The gold standard for diagnosis of Fitz-Hugh–Curtis syndrome, though rarely required, is laparoscopy with direct visualization of the characteristic "violin string adhesions" along with liver capsule scarring and inflammation. Antibody testing of 57-kDa chlamydial heat-shock protein can be done in cases where all other tests have been non-diagnostic and the clinical suspicion remains high.

== Treatment ==
The mainstay of treatment of Fitz-Hugh–Curtis syndrome is antibiotics targeted at the causal organism. The CDC recommends a low threshold for treatment given the high risk of infertility and ectopic pregnancies with untreated disease. Antibiotic therapy should cover the most common pathogens including Chlamydia, Gonorrhea, other gram-negatives, and anaerobes. Current guidelines recommend ceftriaxone and azithromycin as Chlamydia and Gonorrhea constitute the vast majority of cases, treatment for complicated PID involves the combination of ceftriaxone, doxycycline, and metronidazole. In cases of refractory pain, laparoscopy may be considered for lysis of adhesions.

== Prognosis ==
With treatment, the prognosis of Fitz-Hugh–Curtis syndrome is excellent with vast majority of patients seeing complete resolution of symptoms. Complications of the disease include infertility, small bowel obstruction due to adhesions, chronic pelvic pain, recurrent salpingitis, and ectopic pregnancy.
