= Pelvic inflammatory disease =

Infection of uterus, fallopian tubes, ovaries or the inner surface of pelvis

- Other names: Pelvic inflammatory disorder
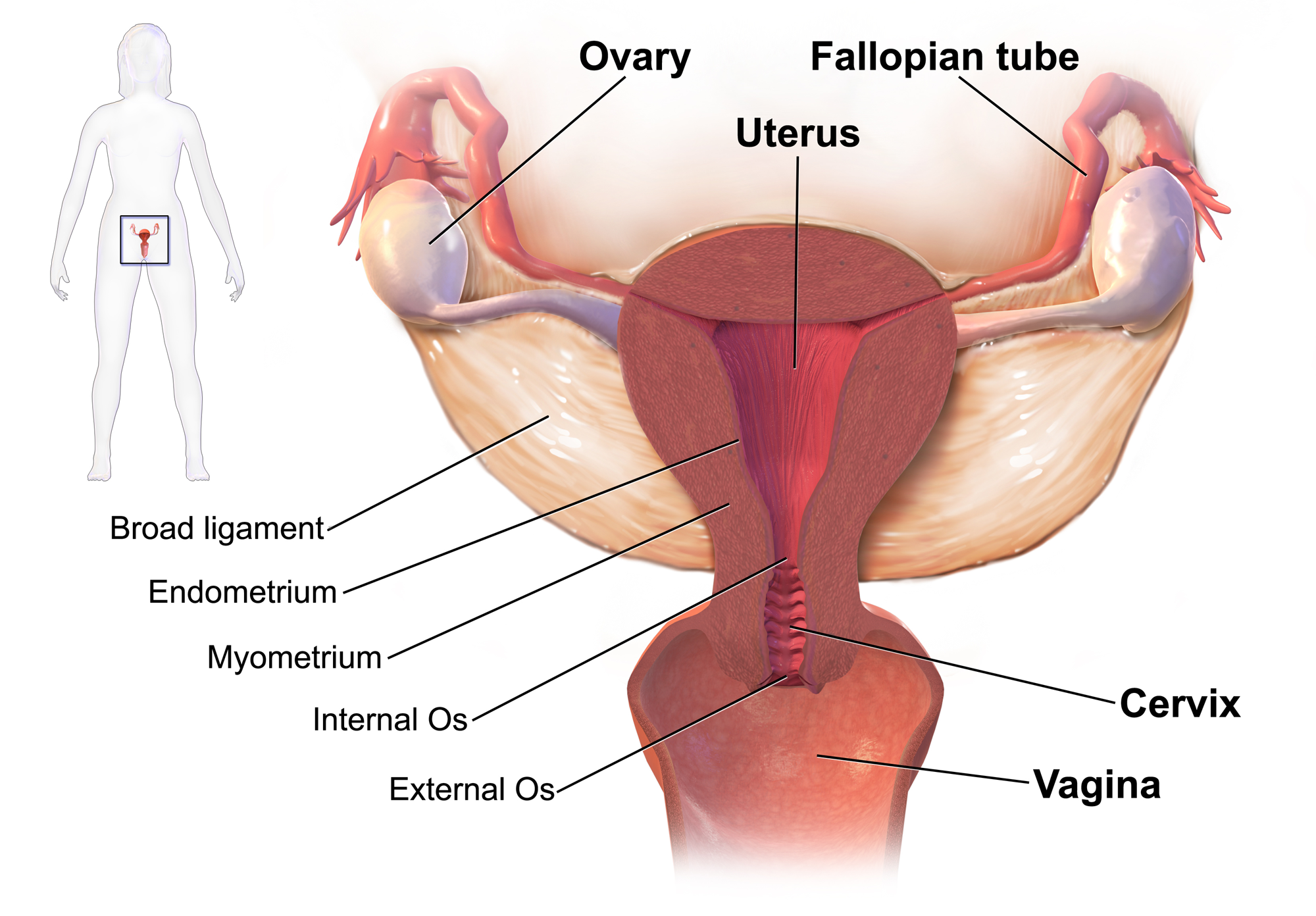
- Drawing showing the usual sites of infection in pelvic inflammatory disease
- Specialty: Gynecology
- Symptoms: Lower abdominal pain, vaginal discharge, fever, burning with urination, pain with sex, irregular menstruation
- Complications: Infertility, ectopic pregnancy, chronic pelvic pain, cancer
- Causes: Bacteria that spread from the vagina and cervix
- Risk factors: Gonorrhea, chlamydia
- Diagnostic method: Based on symptoms, ultrasound, laparoscopic surgery
- Prevention: Not having sex, having few sexual partners, using condoms
- Treatment: Antibiotics
- Frequency: 1.5 percent of young women yearly

Pelvic inflammatory disease (PID), also known as pelvic inflammatory disorder, is an infection of the upper part of the female reproductive system, mainly the uterus, fallopian tubes, and ovaries, and inside of the pelvis. Often, there may be no symptoms. Signs and symptoms, when present, may include lower abdominal pain, vaginal discharge, fever, burning with urination, pain with sex, bleeding after sex, or irregular menstruation. Untreated PID can result in long-term complications including infertility, ectopic pregnancy, chronic pelvic pain, and cancer.

The disease is caused by bacteria that spread from the vagina and cervix. It has been reported that infections by Neisseria gonorrhoeae or Chlamydia trachomatis are present in 75 to 90 percent of cases. However, in the UK it is reported by the NHS that infections by Neisseria gonorrhoeae and Chlamydia trachomatis are responsible for only a quarter of PID cases. Often, multiple different bacteria are involved.

Without treatment, about 10 percent of those with a chlamydial infection and 40 percent of those with a gonorrhea infection will develop PID. Risk factors are generally similar to those of sexually transmitted infections and include a high number of sexual partners and drug use. Vaginal douching may also increase the risk. The diagnosis is typically based on the presenting signs and symptoms. It is recommended that the disease be considered in all women of childbearing age who have lower abdominal pain. A definitive diagnosis of PID is made by finding pus involving the fallopian tubes during surgery. Ultrasound may also be useful in diagnosis.

Efforts to prevent the disease include not having sex or having few sexual partners and using condoms. Screening women at risk for chlamydial infection followed by treatment decreases the risk of PID. If the diagnosis is suspected, treatment is typically advised. Treating a woman's sexual partners should also occur. In those with mild or moderate symptoms, a single injection of the antibiotic ceftriaxone along with two weeks of doxycycline and possibly metronidazole by mouth is recommended. For those who do not improve after three days or who have severe disease, intravenous antibiotics should be used.

Globally, about 106 million cases of chlamydia and 106 million cases of gonorrhea occurred in 2008. The number of cases of PID, however, is not clear. It is estimated to affect about 1.5 percent of young women yearly. In the United States, PID is estimated to affect about one million people each year. A type of intrauterine device (IUD) known as the Dalkon shield led to increased rates of PID in the 1970s. Current IUDs are not associated with this problem after the first month.

== Signs and symptoms ==
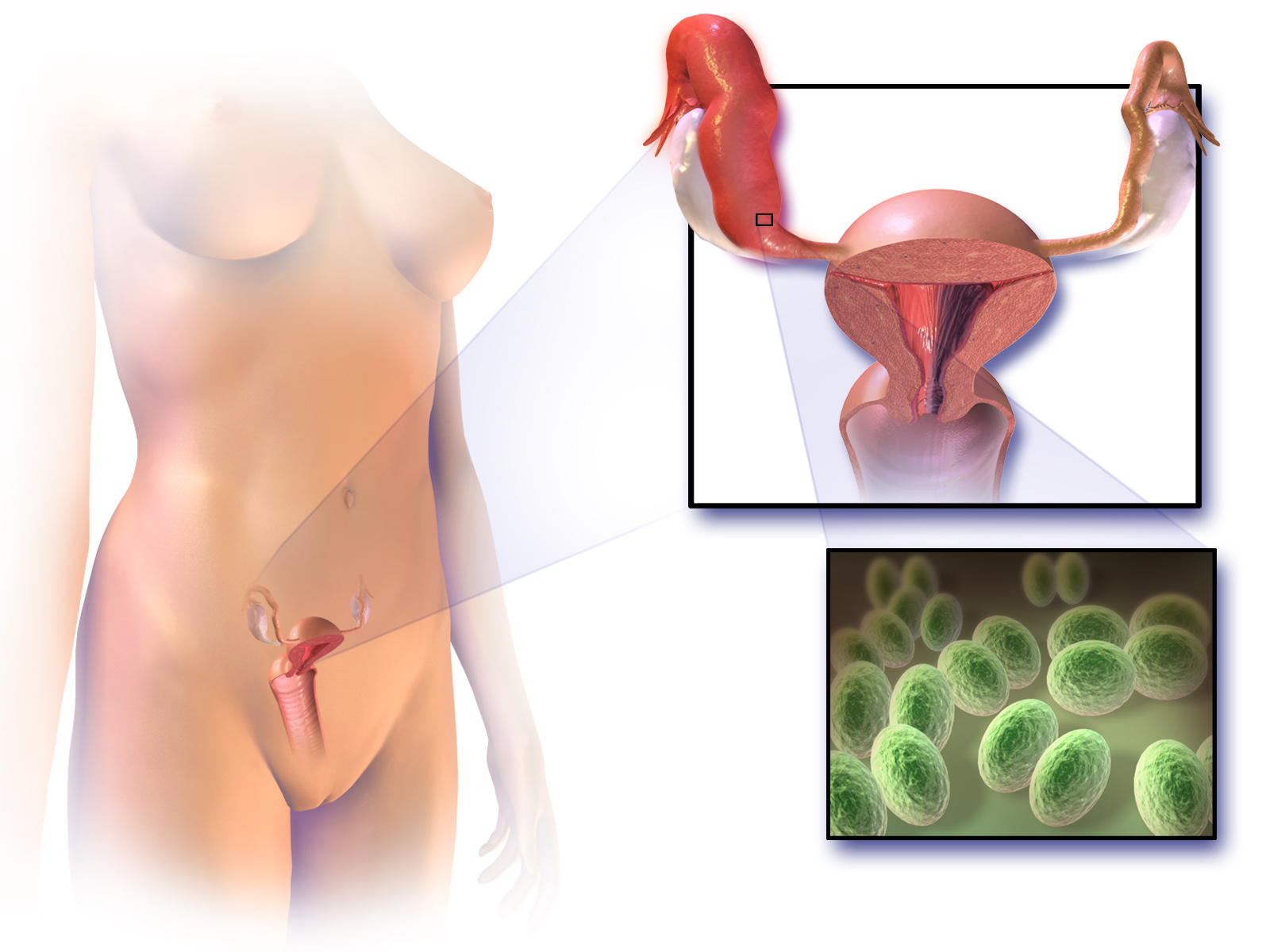
Illustration of pelvic inflammatory disease

Symptoms in PID range from none to severe. If there are symptoms, fever, cervical motion tenderness, lower abdominal pain, new or different discharge, painful intercourse, uterine tenderness, adnexal tenderness, or irregular menstruation may be noted.

Other complications include endometritis, salpingitis, tubo-ovarian abscess, pelvic peritonitis, periappendicitis, and perihepatitis.

=== Complications ===
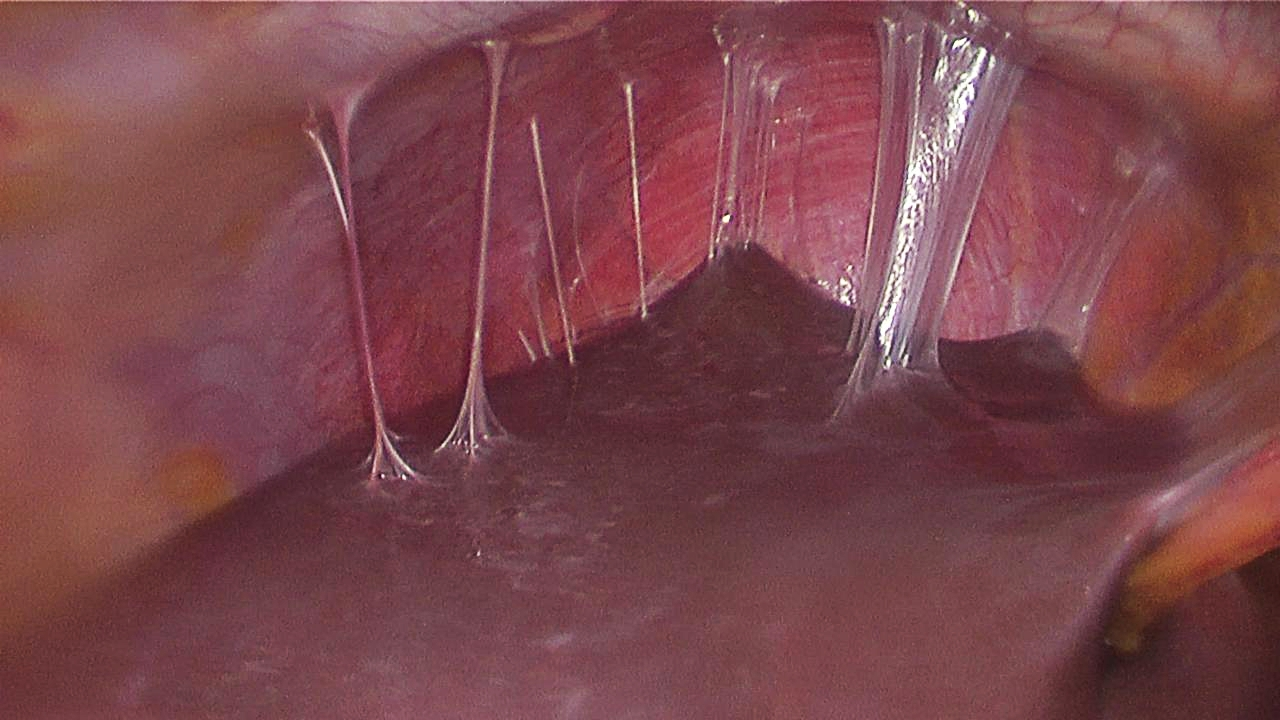
Fitz-Hugh–Curtis syndrome with perihepatic adhesions following a chlamydia infection

PID can cause scarring inside the reproductive system, which can later cause serious complications, including chronic pelvic pain, infertility, ectopic pregnancy (the leading cause of pregnancy-related deaths in adult females), and other complications of pregnancy. Occasionally, the infection can spread to the peritoneum causing inflammation and the formation of scar tissue on the external surface of the liver (Fitz-Hugh–Curtis syndrome).

== Cause ==
Chlamydia trachomatis and Neisseria gonorrhoeae are common causes of PID. However, PID can also be caused by other untreated infections, like bacterial vaginosis. Data suggest that PID is often polymicrobial. Isolated anaerobes and facultative microorganisms have been obtained from the upper genital tract. N. gonorrhoeae has been isolated from fallopian tubes, facultative and anaerobic organisms were recovered from endometrial tissues.

The anatomical structure of the internal organs and tissues of the female reproductive tract provides a pathway for pathogens to ascend from the vagina to the pelvic cavity through the infundibulum. The disturbance of the naturally occurring vaginal microbiota associated with bacterial vaginosis increases the risk of PID.

N. gonorrhoea and C. trachomatis are the most common organisms. The least common were infections caused exclusively by anaerobes and facultative organisms. Anaerobes and facultative bacteria were also isolated from 50 percent of the patients from whom Chlamydia and Neisseria were recovered; thus, anaerobes and facultative bacteria were present in the upper genital tract of nearly two-thirds of the PID patients. PCR and serological tests have associated extremely fastidious organism with endometritis, PID, and tubal factor infertility. Microorganisms associated with PID are listed below.

Cases of PID have developed in people who have stated they have never had sex.

=== Bacteria ===
- Chlamydia trachomatis
- Neisseria gonorrhoeae
- Prevotella spp.
- Streptococcus pyogenes
- Prevotella bivia
- Prevotella disiens
- Bacteroides spp.
- Peptostreptococcus asaccharolyticus
- Peptostreptococcus anaerobius
- Gardnerella vaginalis
- Escherichia coli
- Group B streptococcus
- α-hemolytic streptococcus
- Coagulase-negative staphylococcus
- Atopobium vaginae
- Acinetobacter spp.
- Dialister spp.
- Fusobacterium gonidiaformans
- Gemella spp.
- Leptotrichia spp.
- Mogibacterium spp.
- Porphyromonas spp.
- Sphingomonas spp.
- Veillonella spp.
- Cutibacterium acnes
- Mycoplasma genitalium
- Mycoplasma hominis
- Ureaplasma spp.

== Diagnosis ==
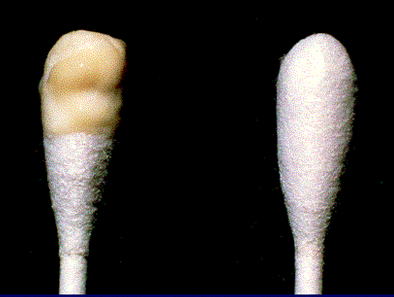
Mucopurulent cervical discharge seen on a cotton bud

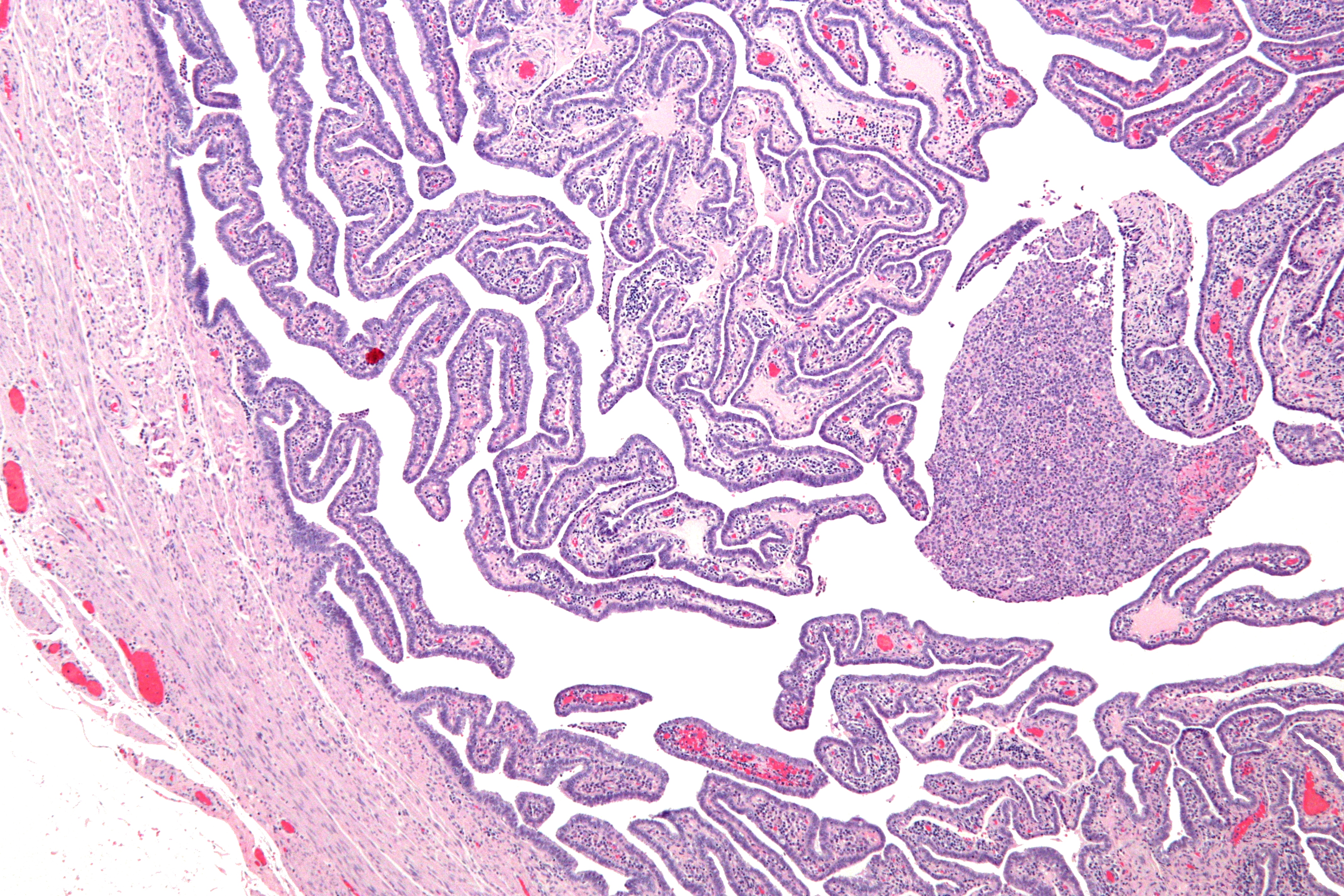
Micrograph of salpingitis – a component of pelvic inflammatory disease. H&E stain.

Upon a pelvic examination, cervical motion, uterine, or adnexal tenderness will be experienced. Mucopurulent cervicitis and or urethritis may be observed. In severe cases, more testing may be required, such as laparoscopy, intra-abdominal bacteria sampling and culturing, or tissue biopsy.

Laparoscopy can visualize "violin-string" adhesions, characteristic of Fitz-Hugh–Curtis perihepatitis and other abscesses that may be present.

Other imaging methods, such as ultrasonography, computed tomography (CT), and magnetic resonance imaging (MRI), can aid in diagnosis. Blood tests can also help identify the presence of infection: the erythrocyte sedimentation rate (ESR), the C-reactive protein (CRP) level, and chlamydial and gonococcal DNA probes.

Nucleic acid amplification tests (NAATs), direct fluorescein tests (DFA), and enzyme-linked immunosorbent assays (ELISA) are highly sensitive tests that can identify specific pathogens present. Serology testing for antibodies is not as useful since the presence of the microorganisms in healthy people can confound interpreting the antibody titer levels, although antibody levels can indicate whether an infection is recent or long-term.

Definitive criteria include histopathologic evidence of endometritis, thickened, filled fallopian tubes, or laparoscopic findings. Gram stain/smear becomes definitive in the identification of rare, atypical and possibly more serious organisms. Two-thirds of patients with laparoscopic evidence of previous PID were not aware they had PID, but even asymptomatic PID can cause serious harm.

Laparoscopic identification is helpful in diagnosing tubal disease; a 65 percent to 90 percent positive predictive value exists in patients with presumed PID.

Upon gynecologic ultrasound, a potential finding is tubo-ovarian complex, which is edematous and dilated pelvic structures as evidenced by vague margins, but without abscess formation.

=== Differential diagnosis ===
Several other causes may produce similar symptoms, including appendicitis, ectopic pregnancy, hemorrhagic or ruptured ovarian cysts, ovarian torsion, endometriosis and gastroenteritis, peritonitis, and bacterial vaginosis, among others.

Pelvic inflammatory disease is more likely to recur when there is a prior history of the infection, recent sexual contact, recent onset of menses, or an IUD (intrauterine device) in place, or if the partner has a sexually transmitted infection.

Acute pelvic inflammatory disease is highly unlikely when recent intercourse has not taken place or an IUD is not being used. A sensitive serum pregnancy test is typically obtained to rule out ectopic pregnancy. Culdocentesis will differentiate hemoperitoneum (ruptured ectopic pregnancy or hemorrhagic cyst) from pelvic sepsis (salpingitis, ruptured pelvic abscess, or ruptured appendix).

Pelvic and vaginal ultrasounds are helpful in the diagnosis of PID. In the early stages of infection, the ultrasound may appear normal. As the disease progresses, nonspecific findings can include free pelvic fluid, endometrial thickening, uterine cavity distension by fluid or gas. In some instances, the borders of the uterus and ovaries appear indistinct. Enlarged ovaries accompanied by increased numbers of small cysts correlate with PID.

Laparoscopy is infrequently used to diagnose pelvic inflammatory disease since it is not readily available. Moreover, it might not detect subtle inflammation of the fallopian tubes, and it fails to detect endometritis. Nevertheless, laparoscopy is conducted if the diagnosis is not certain or if the person has not responded to antibiotic therapy after 48 hours.

No single test has adequate sensitivity and specificity to diagnose pelvic inflammatory disease. A large multisite U.S. study found that cervical motion tenderness as a minimum clinical criterion increases the sensitivity of the CDC diagnostic criteria from 83 percent to 95 percent. However, even the modified 2002 CDC criteria do not identify women with subclinical disease.

== Prevention ==
Regular testing for sexually transmitted infections is encouraged for prevention. The risk of contracting pelvic inflammatory disease can be reduced by the following:

- Using barrier methods such as condoms; see human sexual behaviour for other listings. Using latex condoms to prevent STIs that may go untreated.
- Seeking medical attention if you are experiencing symptoms of PID.
- Using hormonal combined contraceptive pills also helps in reducing the chances of PID by thickening the cervical mucosal plug & hence preventing the ascent of causative organisms from the lower genital tract.
- Seeking medical attention after learning that a current or former sex partner has, or might have had a sexually transmitted infection.
- Getting an STI history from your current partner and strongly encouraging them to be tested and treated before intercourse.
- Diligence in avoiding vaginal activity, particularly intercourse, after the end of a pregnancy (delivery, miscarriage, or abortion) or certain gynecological procedures, to ensure that the cervix closes.
- Reducing the number of sexual partners, as in sexual monogamy.
- Avoiding the use of a douche that can upset the natural vaginal microbiota balance.

== Treatment ==
Treatment is often started without confirmation of infection because of the serious complications that may result from delayed treatment. Treatment depends on the infectious agent and generally involves the use of antibiotic therapy although there is no clear evidence of which antibiotic regimen is more effective and safe in the management of PID. If there is no improvement within two to three days, the patient is typically advised to seek further medical attention. Hospitalization sometimes becomes necessary if there are other complications. Treating sexual partners for possible STIs can help in treatment and prevention. There should be no wait for STI results to start treatment. Treatment should not be avoided for longer than 2-3 days due to the risk of infertility.

For women with PID of mild to moderate severity, parenteral and oral therapies appear to be effective. It does not matter to their short- or long-term outcome whether antibiotics are administered to them as inpatients or outpatients. Typical regimens include cefoxitin or cefotetan plus doxycycline, and clindamycin plus gentamicin. An alternative parenteral regimen is ampicillin/sulbactam plus doxycycline. Erythromycin-based medications can also be used. A single study suggests superiority of azithromycin over doxycycline. Another alternative is to use a parenteral regimen with ceftriaxone or cefoxitin plus doxycycline. Clinical experience guides decisions regarding transition from parenteral to oral therapy, which usually can be initiated within 24–48 hours of clinical improvement.

- When PID is caught early, some treatments can be utilized; however, these treatments will not undo any damage PID may have caused.
- If previously having a PID diagnosis and were to be exposed to another STI, the risk of having PID recur is higher
- Early treatment can not prevent the following:
  - chronic abdominal pain.
  - infertility and or ectopic pregnancies.
  - scar tissue within or outside the fallopian tubes.

== Prognosis ==
Early diagnosis and immediate treatment are vital in reducing the chances of later complications from PID. Delaying treatment for even a few days could greatly increase the chances of further complications. Even when the PID infection is cured, the effects of the infection may be permanent or long-lasting. This makes early identification essential.

A limitation of this is that diagnostic tests are not included in routine check-ups, and cannot be done using signs and symptoms alone; the required diagnostic tests are more invasive than that. Treatment resulting in cure is very important in the prevention of damage to the reproductive system. Around 20 percent of women with PID develop infertility. Even women who do not experience intense symptoms or are asymptomatic can become infertile. This can be caused by the formation of scar tissue due to one or more episodes of PID, and can lead to tubal blockage. Both of these increase the risk of the inability to get pregnant, and 1% results in an ectopic pregnancy. Chronic pelvic/abdominal pain develops post PID 40% of the time. Certain occurrences such as a post pelvic operation, the period of time immediately after childbirth (postpartum), miscarriage or abortion increase the risk of acquiring another infection leading to PID.

== Epidemiology ==
Globally, about 106 million cases of chlamydia and 106 million cases of gonorrhea occurred in 2008. The number of cases of PID; however, is not clear.This is largely due to diagnostic tests being invasive and not included in routine check-ups, despite PID being the most common reason for individuals to admit themselves under gynecological care. It is estimated to affect about 1.5 percent of young women yearly. In the United States, PID is estimated to affect about one million people yearly. Rates are highest among teenagers and first-time mothers. PID causes over 100,000 women to become infertile in the US each year.

== Prevalence ==
Records show that...

- 18/10000 recorded discharges in the US after a diagnosis of PID.
- Prevalence of self-reported cases of PID for 18–44 was approximately 4.4%.
- Findings that PID has an associated risk with a previous STI diagnosis compared to women with no previous STI diagnosis
- 1.1% of women, 16-46 years of age, in England and Wales are diagnosed with PID.

Despite the indications of a general decrease in PID rates, there is an observed rise in the prevalence of gonorrhea and chlamydia. With that, in order to decrease the prevalence of PID, one should test for gonorrhea and chlamydia.

Two nationally representative probability surveys referenced are the National Health and Nutrition Examination Survey (NHANES) and the National Survey of Family Growth (NSFG) surveyed women aged 18 to 44 from 2013 to 2014.

The results:

- 2.5 million women have had a PID diagnosis in the past.
- The self-reported history decreased from 4.1% in 2013 to 3.6% in 2017.
- It is possible that increased screening at annual gynecologist appointments has led to an earlier detection and prevention of PID.
  - In white non-Hispanic women, the prevalence decreased from 4.9% to 3.9%, and in Hispanic women, the prevalence decreased from 5.3% to 3.7%. In black non-Hispanic women, the prevalence increased from 3.8% to 6.3%.
- The highest burden of PID recently is in black women and women living in the Southern United States, where there is a higher prevalence of STIs as well.
  - Disparities between races could be due to lower socioeconomic status. Those with a lower income are less likely to get an annual gynecologist appointment or other preventative measures and are more likely to be uninsured.

== Population at risk ==
- Those who are sexually active with female (intact)reproductive organs and are under the age of 25
- Rarely observed in females who have had a hysterectomy
- Overall age range 18-44
- Those who have an STI that has gone untreated.
- Women with more than one sexual partner
- Inconsistent condom use for those not in a mutually monogamous relationship
