= Ceftriaxone =

Antibiotic medication

Clinical data
- Pronunciation: /ˌsɛftraɪˈæksoʊn/
- Trade names: Rocephin, Epicephin, Wintriaxone, others
- AHFS/Drugs.com: Monograph
- MedlinePlus: a685032
- License data: US DailyMed: Ceftriaxone
- Pregnancy category: AU: B1
- Routes of administration: Intravenous, intramuscular
- Drug class: Third-generation cephalosporin
- ATC code: J01DD04 (WHO)

Legal status
- Legal status: AU: S4 (Prescription only); US: ℞-only

Pharmacokinetic data
- Bioavailability: n/a
- Metabolism: Negligible
- Elimination half-life: 5.8–8.7 hours
- Excretion: 33–67% kidney, 35–45% biliary

Identifiers
- IUPAC name: (6R,7R)-7-{[(2Z)-2-(2-amino-1,3-thiazol-4-yl)->2-(methoxyimino)acetyl]amino}-3-{[(2-methyl-5,6-dioxo-1,2,5,6-tetrahydro-1,2,4-triazin-3-yl)thio]methyl}-8-oxo-5-thia-1-azabicyclo[4.2.0]oct-2-ene-2-carboxylic acid
- CAS Number: 73384-59-5
- PubChem CID: 5479530
- IUPHAR/BPS: 5326
- DrugBank: DB01212
- ChemSpider: 4586394
- UNII: 75J73V1629
- KEGG: D07659
- ChEBI: CHEBI:29007
- ChEMBL: ChEMBL161
- PDB ligand: 9F2 (PDBe, RCSB PDB)
- CompTox Dashboard (EPA): DTXSID0022773
- ECHA InfoCard: 100.070.347

Chemical and physical data
- Formula: C_{18}H_{18}N_{8}O_{7}S_{3}
- Molar mass: 554.57 g·mol^{−1}
- 3D model (JSmol): Interactive image
- SMILES: O=C2N1/C(=C(\CS[C@@H]1[C@@H]2NC(=O)C(=N\OC)/c3nc(sc3)N)CS\C4=N\C(=O)C(=O)NN4C)C(=O)O
- InChI: InChI=1S/C18H18N8O7S3/c1-25-18(22-12(28)13(29)23-25)36-4-6-3-34-15-9(14(30)26(15)10(6)16(31)32)21-11(27)8(24-33-2)7-5-35-17(19)20-7/h5,9,15H,3-4H2,1-2H3,(H2,19,20)(H,21,27)(H,23,29)(H,31,32)/b24-8-/t9-,15-/m1/s1; Key:VAAUVRVFOQPIGI-SPQHTLEESA-N

Ceftriaxone, sold under the brand name Rocephin, is a third-generation cephalosporin antibiotic used for the treatment of a number of bacterial infections. These include middle ear infections, endocarditis, meningitis, pneumonia, bone and joint infections, intra-abdominal infections, skin infections, urinary tract infections, gonorrhea, and pelvic inflammatory disease. It is also sometimes used before surgery and following a bite wound to try to prevent infection. Ceftriaxone can be given by injection into a vein or into a muscle.

Common side effects include pain at the site of injection and allergic reactions. Other possible side effects include C. difficile-associated diarrhea, hemolytic anemia, gall bladder disease, and seizures. It is not recommended in those who have had anaphylaxis to penicillin but may be used in those who have had milder reactions. The intravenous form should not be given with intravenous calcium. There is tentative evidence that ceftriaxone is relatively safe during pregnancy and breastfeeding. It is a third-generation cephalosporin that works by preventing bacteria from making a cell wall.

Ceftriaxone was patented in 1978 and approved for medical use in 1982. It is on the World Health Organization's List of Essential Medicines. It is available as a generic medication.

== Medical use ==
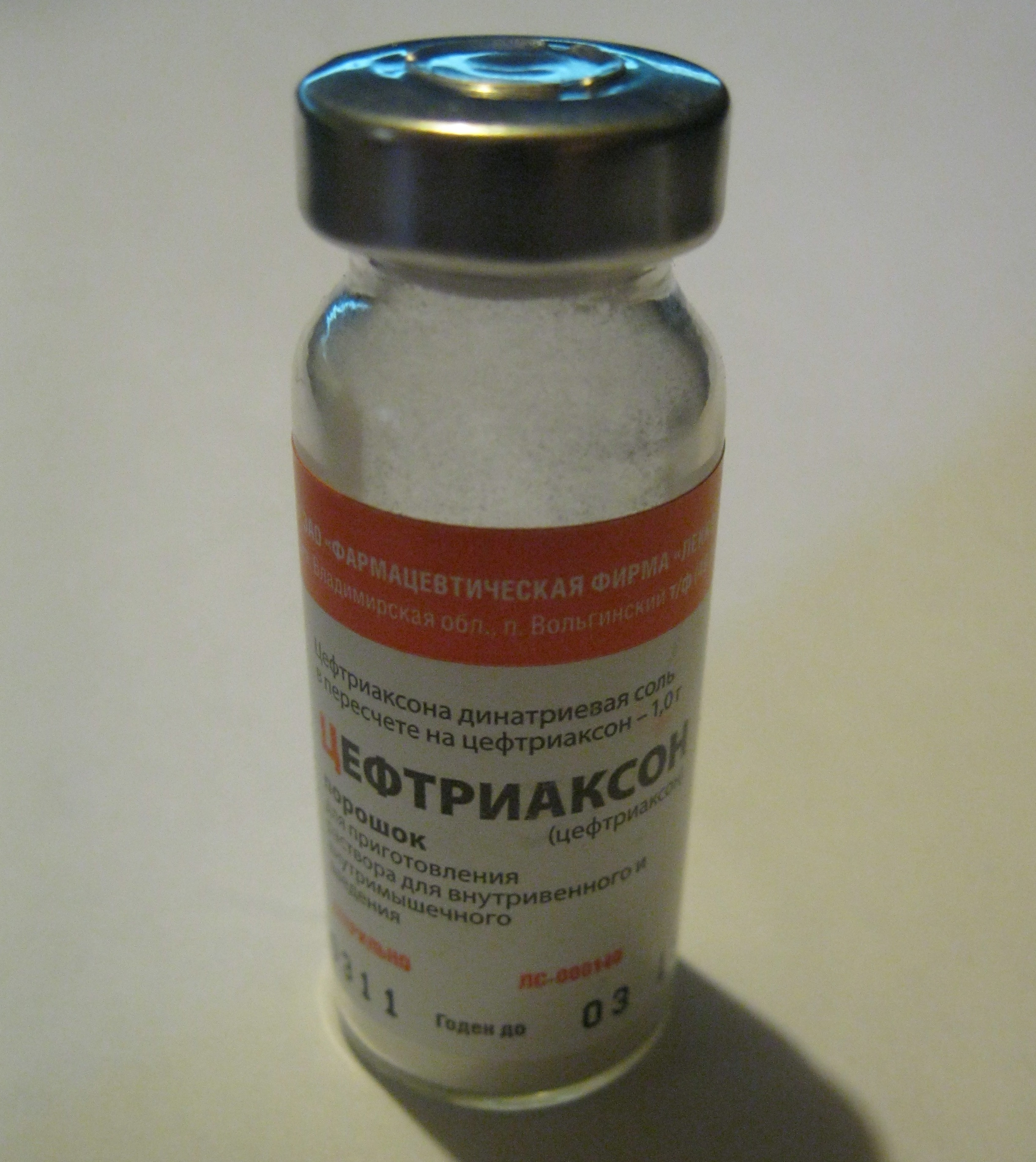
A vial of ceftriaxone, manufactured and sold in Russia

Ceftriaxone and other third-generation cephalosporin antibiotics are used to treat organisms that tend to be resistant to many other antibiotics. Due to emergent resistance, ceftriaxone should not be used for the treatment of Enterobacter infections. Before using ceftriaxone, it is important to determine the susceptibility of the bacteria. If sepsis is being considered, empiric therapy may be initiated prior to susceptibility testing.

Medical uses include:

- lower respiratory tract infections
- acute bacterial otitis media
- skin and skin structure infections
- urinary tract infections
- uncomplicated gonorrhea
- pelvic inflammatory disease
- bacterial sepsis
- intra-abdominal infections
- meningitis
- surgical prophylaxis
- Lyme disease

Ceftriaxone is also a choice drug for treatment of bacterial meningitis caused by pneumococci, meningococci, Haemophilus influenzae, and "susceptible enteric Gram-negative rods, but not Listeria monocytogenes."

In combination with doxycycline or azithromycin, ceftriaxone used to be recommended by the United States Centers for Disease Control and Prevention (CDC) for the treatment of uncomplicated gonorrhea. Due to increased risk of developing azithromycin resistant strains and the high efficacy of higher doses of ceftriaxone the guidance has been updated to mono-antibiotic therapy with a higher dose of ceftriaxone.

=== Spectrum of activity ===
Like other third-generation cephalosporins, ceftriaxone is active against Citrobacter spp., Serratia marcescens, and beta-lactamase-producing strains of Haemophilus and Neisseria. However, unlike ceftazidime and cefoperazone, ceftriaxone does not have useful activity against Pseudomonas aeruginosa. It is generally not active against Enterobacter species, and its use should be avoided in the treatment of Enterobacter infections, even if the isolate appears susceptible, because of the emergence of resistance. Some organisms, such as Citrobacter, Providencia, and Serratia, have the ability to become resistant through the development of cephalosporinases (enzymes that hydrolyze cephalosporins and render them inactive). Although not being used as first line therapy against Staphylococcus aureus, ceftriaxone retains activity against isolates of methicillin-susceptible S. aureus and is used in clinic for infections sustained by this bacterium. In this case the dose should be doubled (e.g. 2 g intravenously every 12 hours).

=== Available forms ===
Ceftriaxone is available for administration via the intramuscular or the intravenous routes. Ceftriaxone is stored as a dry powder in a vial, and is reconstituted (dissolved) immediately before use. The solution is used promptly after preparation, still, reconstituted solutions retain their physical and chemical stability for 24 hours at 25°C (or for 3 days when stored between 2 and 8°C). The solutions are pale yellowish in color, but the change of color to amber or reddish suggests hydrolysis of the amide bond of the β-lactam ring, thereby affecting the antimicrobial activity of the antibiotic. Diluents containing calcium are not used to reconstitute ceftriaxone, and it must not be administered in intravenous lines containing other calcium-containing solutions, as a ceftriaxone-calcium precipitate could form. This precipitation risk is particularly high in newborns (up to age 28 days), especially if they are premature or have impaired bilirubin binding. Beyond the approved intramuscular and intravenous routes, ceftriaxone has also been administered off-label via the subcutaneous route. This practice has been reported in multiple clinical series, particularly in elderly, frail, or palliative-care patients and in those with difficult venous access. Pharmacokinetic data and clinical observations suggest that subcutaneous ceftriaxone provides adequate systemic exposure and is generally well tolerated, with reported clinical effectiveness comparable to intravenous administration in selected, non–critically ill patients.

=== Specific populations ===
==== Pregnancy ====
Ceftriaxone is pregnancy category B. It has not been observed to cause birth defects in animal studies, but a lack of well-controlled studies done in pregnant women exists.

==== Breastfeeding ====
Low concentrations of ceftriaxone are excreted in breast milk that are "not expected to cause adverse effects in breastfed infants." The manufacturer recommends that caution be exercised when administering ceftriaxone to women who breastfeed.

==== Newborns ====
Hyperbilirubinemic neonates are contraindicated for the use of ceftriaxone. It can compete with bilirubin and displace it from binding to albumin, increasing the risk of bilirubin encephalopathy.

==== Elderly ====
According to the package insert, clinical studies did not show differences in efficacy and safety of ceftriaxone in geriatrics compared to younger patients but "greater sensitivity of some older individuals cannot be ruled out."

== Adverse effects ==
Although generally well tolerated, the most common adverse reactions associated with ceftriaxone are changes in white blood cell counts, local reactions at site of administration, rash, and diarrhea.

Incidence of adverse effects greater than 1%:

- Eosinophilia (6%)
- Thrombocytosis (5.1%)
- Elevations in liver enzymes (3.1–3.3%)
- Diarrhea (2.7%)
- Leukopenia (2.1%)
- Elevation in BUN (1.2%)
- Local reactions: pain, tenderness, irritation (1%)
- Rash (1.7%)

Some less frequently reported adverse events (incidence < 1%) include phlebitis, itchiness, fever, chills, nausea, vomiting, elevations of bilirubin, elevations in creatinine, headache and dizziness.

Ceftriaxone may precipitate in bile, causing biliary sludge, biliary pseudolithiasis, and gallstones, especially in children. Hypoprothrombinaemia and bleeding are specific side effects. Haemolysis is reported. It has also been reported to cause post kidney failure in children. Like other antibiotics, ceftriaxone use can result in Clostridioides difficile-associated diarrhea ranging from mild diarrhea to fatal colitis. In this regard it has been reported that shifting from ceftriaxone to cefotaxime would have a lower impact on C. difficile infection rates, since cefotaxime is almost entirely excreted by the kidneys while ceftriaxone has a 45% biliary excretion

=== Contraindications ===
Ceftriaxone should not be used in those with an allergy to ceftriaxone or any component of the formulation. Although there is negligible cross-reactivity between penicillins and third-generation cephalosporins, caution should still be used when using ceftriaxone in penicillin-sensitive patients. Caution should be used in people who have had previous severe penicillin allergies. It should not be used in hyperbilirubinemic neonates, particularly those who are premature because ceftriaxone is reported to displace bilirubin from albumin binding sites, potentially causing bilirubin encephalopathy. Concomitant use with intravenous calcium-containing solutions/products in neonates (≤28 days) is contraindicated even if administered through different infusion lines due to rare fatal cases of calcium-ceftriaxone precipitations in neonatal lungs and kidneys.

== Mechanism of action ==
Ceftriaxone is a third-generation antibiotic from the cephalosporin family of antibiotics. It is within the β-lactam family of antibiotics. Ceftriaxone selectively and irreversibly inhibits bacterial cell wall synthesis by binding to transpeptidases, also called transamidases, which are penicillin-binding proteins (PBPs) that catalyze the cross-linking of the peptidoglycan polymers forming the bacterial cell wall. The peptidoglycan cell wall is made up of pentapeptide units attached to a polysaccharide backbone with alternating units of N-acetylglucosamine and N-acetylmuramic acid. PBPs act on a terminal D-alanyl-D-alanine moiety on a pentapeptide unit and catalyze the formation of a peptide bond between the penultimate D-alanine and a glycine unit on an adjacent peptidoglycan strand, releasing the terminal D-alanine unit in the process. The structure of ceftriaxone mimics the D-alanyl-D-alanine moiety, and the PBP attacks the beta-lactam ring in ceftriaxone as if it were its normal D-alanyl-D-alanine substrate. The peptidoglycan cross-linking activity of PBPs is a construction and repair mechanism that normally helps to maintain bacterial cell wall integrity, so the inhibition of PBPs leads to damage and destruction of the cell wall and eventually to cell lysis.

== Pharmacokinetics ==
=== Absorption ===
Ceftriaxone can be administered intravenously and intramuscularly, and the drug is completely absorbed. It is not available orally.

=== Distribution ===
Ceftriaxone penetrates tissues and body fluids well, including cerebrospinal fluid to treat central nervous system infections. Ceftriaxone is reversibly bound to human plasma proteins and the binding of ceftriaxone decreases with increasing concentration from a value of 95% at plasma concentrations less than 25 mcg/mL to 85% at plasma concentration of 300 mcg/mL. Over a 0.15 to 3 g dose range in healthy adult subjects, the apparent volume of distribution ranged from 5.8 to 13.5 L.

=== Metabolism ===
33–67% of ceftriaxone is renally excreted as unchanged drug, but no dose adjustments are required in renal impairment with dosages up to 2 grams per day. The rest is excreted in the bile as unchanged drug which is ultimately excreted in feces as inactive compounds from hepatic and gut flora metabolism.

=== Elimination ===
The average elimination half-life in healthy adults is 5.8–8.7 (mean 6.5) hours, with some reviews estimated half-life is up to 10 hours. In people with renal impairment, the average elimination half-life increases to 11.4–15.7 hours.

== Chemistry ==
Ceftriaxone is commercially available as a white to yellowish-orange crystalline powder for reconstitution. Reconstituted ceftriaxone injection solutions are light yellow- to amber-colored depending on how long the solution had been reconstituted, the concentration of ceftriaxone in the solution, and the diluent used. To reduce pain with intramuscular injections, ceftriaxone may be reconstituted with lidocaine.

The syn-configuration of the methoxy oxime moiety confers resistance to beta-lactamase enzymes produced by many Gram-negative bacteria. The stability of this configuration results in increased activity of ceftriaxone against otherwise resistant Gram-negative bacteria. In place of the easily hydrolyzed acetyl group of cefotaxime, ceftriaxone has a metabolically stable thiotriazinedione moiety.

== Research ==
Ceftriaxone has also been investigated for efficacy in preventing relapse to cocaine addiction.

Ceftriaxone seems to increase excitatory amino acid transporter-2 pump expression and activity in the central nervous system, so has a potential to reduce glutamatergic toxicity.

Ceftriaxone has been shown to have neuroprotective properties in a number of neurological disorders, including spinal muscular atrophy and amyotrophic lateral sclerosis (ALS). Despite earlier negative results in the 1990s, a large clinical trial was undertaken in 2006 to test ceftriaxone in ALS patients, but was stopped early after it became clear that the results would not meet the predetermined criteria for efficacy.
