= Uromune =

Vaccine against urinary tract infections

Vaccine description
- Target: Bacteria (E. coli, K. pneumoniae, E. faecalis, P. vulgaris)
- Vaccine type: Inactivated

Clinical data
- Trade names: Uromune
- Other names: MV-140; MV140
- Routes of administration: Sublingual spray
- ATC code: None

Uromune, also known by its developmental code name MV-140, is a polyvalent bacterial vaccine which is used and is being developed for prevention of recurrent urinary tract infections (UTIs). In clinical studies, it has been found to reduce total number of UTIs by about 70%, to increase UTI-free rates from around 25% to 57%, and to increase time to next UTI from about 1.6 months to 9.0 months. It has also been found to reduce subjective UTI symptoms, reduce antibiotic use, and improve quality of life. The effectiveness of the vaccine appears to decrease with time, which might warrant readministration. Uromune is used as a sublingual spray once daily for 3 months.

Side effects of Uromune are considered infrequent, minor, and usually not treatment-related. Uromune is an inactivated combination of four major bacteria known to cause recurrent UTIs, including Escherichia coli, Klebsiella pneumoniae, Enterococcus faecalis, and Proteus vulgaris. It is thought to work by increasing adaptive immunity against UTI-causing bacteria. It might also work by increasing trained immunity against these pathogens.

Uromune first became available for clinical use in 2010 and was first described in the literature by 2012. It was developed and marketed in Spain by Immunotek S.L. Uromune has also been approved in Mexico and the Dominican Republic and is currently pending approval in Canada. The vaccine is under development for use and is available via special-access programs in numerous other countries, including in many European countries, Australia, New Zealand, and Chile, among others. Development and approval in the United States is in progress but is expected to take longer than in other countries. Uromune is also under investigation for other uses besides prevention of uncomplicated recurrent UTIs in adults. In addition, readministration of the vaccine following potential waning effectiveness is being studied.

== Medical uses ==
=== Recurrent urinary tract infections ===
Uromune is used in the prevention of uncomplicated recurrent UTIs in adults. It is indicated specifically for prevention of recurrent UTIs, defined as ≥3 UTIs in 12 months or ≥2 UTIs within 6 months. The vaccine has been described as highly effective against recurrent UTIs. Uromune is a suspension of selected strains of several whole-cell, heat-killed bacteria, including V121 Escherichia coli (25%), V113 Klebsiella pneumoniae (25%), V125 Enterococcus faecalis (25%), and V127 Proteus vulgaris (25%), in glycerol, sodium chloride, artificial pineapple flavoring, and water. These bacteria together are responsible for most cases of UTIs, with E. coli alone responsible for 52 to 80% of recurrent UTIs. Uromune is thought to increase immunity against these UTI-causing bacteria. The vaccine is self-administered as a sublingual spray with two sprays of 100 μL each given once daily for 3 months.

A European phase 3 clinical trial, with results published in 2021 and 2022, found that median 0.0 (IQR 0.0–1.0) UTIs occurred with Uromune and median 3.0 UTIs (IQR 0.5–6.0) occurred with placebo during 9 months following a 3- to 6-month Uromune treatment period in 240 women. There were a total of 249 UTIs with placebo, 80 UTIs with 3-month Uromune (−68% relative to placebo), and 70 UTIs (−72% relative to placebo) with 6-month Uromune during the 9-month period. The 9-month UTI-free rate was 55.7% with 3 months of Uromune treatment and 58.0% with 6 months of Uromune treatment versus 25.0% with placebo. Hence, the UTI-free rate was more than doubled with Uromune in this trial (increased by ~2.3-fold). The median time to first UTI after treatment was 275.0 days with both 3-month and 6-month Uromune relative to 48.0 days with placebo. In subanalyses of the trial, Uromune reduced overall UTI symptoms, resulted in fewer days on antibiotics, and improved total, general, and physical quality of life.

A 2020 systematic review identified three clinical studies of Uromune, including a prospective cohort study, a retrospective cohort study, and a retrospective observational study, all conducted in the United Kingdom or Spain. For short-term efficacy (≤6 months), the UTI-free rate with Uromune was 63.5 to 81%, relative to 3 to 5.6% for antibiotic therapy. For long-term efficacy (>6 months), the UTI-free rate was 56.6% and 90.3%, with the longest reported outcome being 56.6% at 15 months, whereas almost all patients given daily antibiotic therapy had experienced at least one UTI by 12 and 15 months. UTI recurrence occurred at median 180 days with Uromune and median 19 days with antibiotic prophylaxis. A subsequent 2023 review of five observational studies with over 1,400 women, including the above studies, reported that Uromune was associated with higher UTI-free rates (35–58%) relative to 6-month antibiotic prophylaxis (0%) in two comparative observational studies and was associated with UTI-free rates of 33 to 78% over 9 to 24 months of follow-up in three uncontrolled prospective observational studies. Likewise, in the five observational studies with 1,408 women, another 2020 systematic review reported UTI-free rates of 35 to 90% with Uromune in 519 women versus rates of 0–9% with antibiotic prophylaxis in 499 women over 15 months.

In a preliminary analysis of the Health Canada-approved first-in-North America observational study, findings were comparable to previous observational studies. In this study, which included 25 patients, the UTI rate was reduced by 82% for the 9-month post-vaccination period, with number of UTIs reducing from mean 11.5 UTIs/month to 2.1 UTIs/month, and the UTI-free rate during this period was 48% (12 of 25). At 12 months, 80% of subjects (20 of 25) reported that they were moderately or markedly improved. The preceding results are from the pre-COVID-19 pandemic cohort and an expanded follow-up with 64 women has been conducted with results published. In the expanded cohort, there were a mean of 6.8 UTIs/year pre-vaccination, the UTI-free rate over the 9-month post-vaccination period was 40.6%, the reduction of infection rate was 75.3% for this period relative to the year prior to vaccination, and 80.3% reported being moderately or markedly improved at 12-month follow-up, with 58.1% considering themselves "mostly satisfied, pleased, or delighted". Quality of life scored also improved by 1.5 points in the study.

The risk of UTI recurrence with Uromune treatment has been found to increase with time, suggesting that the vaccine gradually wears off. In a 2022 long-term prospective observational study with 1,003 patients, Uromune reduced the number of UTIs to 0–2 in 95.5% at 3 months, in 86.8% at 6 months, and in 54.7% at 12 months. On the basis of these findings, readministration may be warranted and may be studied in the future. However, in a 2024 study that was the first long-term study of Uromune, where 60% of individuals had a single course of Uromune and 40% had repeat courses 1 to 2 years after the first course, 54% of 89 women and men remained UTI-free 5 to 9 years after first receiving the vaccine.

As of May 2023, at least eight clinical studies of Uromune, including one phase 3 randomized controlled trial, have been conducted. These studies have included over 2,200 patients. More than 40,000 patients have received Uromune as of 2023, including at least 22,000 in special-access programs.

== Side effects ==
Side effects of Uromune are reported to be infrequent and minor. In two comparative studies of Uromune versus antibiotics, no adverse reactions were reported with Uromune. In the United Kingdom prospective study, one serious adverse reaction—an allergic reaction—and seven minor adverse reactions (post-nasal drip, mouth stinging, scar itching, abdomen itching, abdominal pain, mild nausea, and worsening of asthma) were reported. In two other studies of 166 and 784 patients, minor side effects including dry mouth (n=8), gastritis (n=4), general illness (n=3), glossitis (n=2), and flare-up of rheumatoid arthritis not thought to be treatment-related (n=1). In the North American clinical study, there were five non-serious adverse reactions and one serious adverse reaction in 25 individuals, with one mild and self-limited adverse reaction deemed potentially vaccine-related. In safety reports of 22,000 patients receiving the vaccine, there were 15 filed reports of adverse reactions for more than 1.5 million doses.

In the phase 3 randomized controlled trial of Uromune versus placebo, there were 76 adverse reactions in the 3-month Uromune group, 48 adverse reactions in the 6-month Uromune group, and 81 adverse reactions in the placebo group. The most frequent adverse reactions, occurring in ≥5% of individuals, were chest infections, candidiasis, and vaginitis. The seven serious adverse reactions, which occurred in five individuals, were considered related to Uromune. Of the 205 adverse effects reported in the trial, 9 (4.4%), presenting in five individuals (2.2%), were considered to be study intervention-related. This included two in the placebo group (2.6%), three with 3-month Uromune (3.9%), and zero with 6-month Uromune (0.0%). On the basis of these findings, it has been concluded that Uromune may be considered a very safe medical intervention.

In the 2020 systematic review, Uromune was described as having acceptable safety and minimal adverse effects.

== Pharmacology ==
The mechanism of action of Uromune is believed to be induction of antibody production and activation of human dendritic cells to generate T helper (Th) 1, Th17, and interleukin-10, in turn resulting in anti-inflammatory T-cell responses in secondary lymphoid organs and locally in the bladder. It is thought that induction of adaptive immunity following Uromune treatment discontinuation results in lasting clinical protection, although trained immunity may also be involved. Uromune is administered sublingually, which is known to bypass degradation by gastric fluids and gastrointestinal enzymes that occurs with oral administration. Moreover, sublingual administration is thought to have the potential to induce mucosal immune responses in a broad range of tissues, including the genitourinary tract. Accordingly, Uromune has been found to induce immune responses both systemically and in the genitourinary tract.

== History ==
Uromune was first described in the literature by 2012. The vaccine has been available since 2010 in clinical practice. It was developed and marketed in Spain by the pharmaceutical company Immunotek S.L. in Madrid. The vaccine has also since been approved in Mexico and the Dominican Republic. As of October 2023, Uromune is under development for use in other countries and is in the preregistration phase of development, with approval pending in Canada. It is also available for patients through various special-access (compassionate-use) programs in 26 countries. Countries where Uromune is under development or available through early-access programs include Australia, Belgium, Canada, Chile, the Czech Republic, Denmark, Finland, France, Germany, Luxembourg, the Netherlands, New Zealand, Norway, Portugal, Romania, Serbia, Slovakia, Slovenia, Sweden, Turkey, and the United Kingdom, among others. A notable exception among countries is the United States, where more stringent clinical trials are likely to be required before Uromune could be approved or made available. Moreover, a United States-based randomized controlled trial may be required for approval in this country. Development of Uromune in Canada has been licensed to Red Leaf Medical.

== Research ==
=== Special populations ===
Clinical development of Uromune for prevention of UTIs in elderly people in long-term care homes, in children with recurrent UTIs, and in adults with complicated recurrent UTIs (e.g., patients with catheters or neurogenic bladder) is in the tentative planning stages. Further assessment of Uromune may also include repeated administration following potential long-term loss of immunity and possible combination with vaccines for related infections.

=== Other UTI vaccines ===
Several other UTI vaccines are also under development. These include OM-89 (OM-8980, UroVaxom; oral tablet), Solco-Urovac (StroVac; vaginal suppository/intramuscular injection), ExPEC4V (V10, JNJ-63871860; intramuscular injection), and SEQ-400 (route unspecified).

== See also ==
- Methenamine
- LACTIN-V
