= Urinary anti-infective agent =

Medication for urinary tract infections

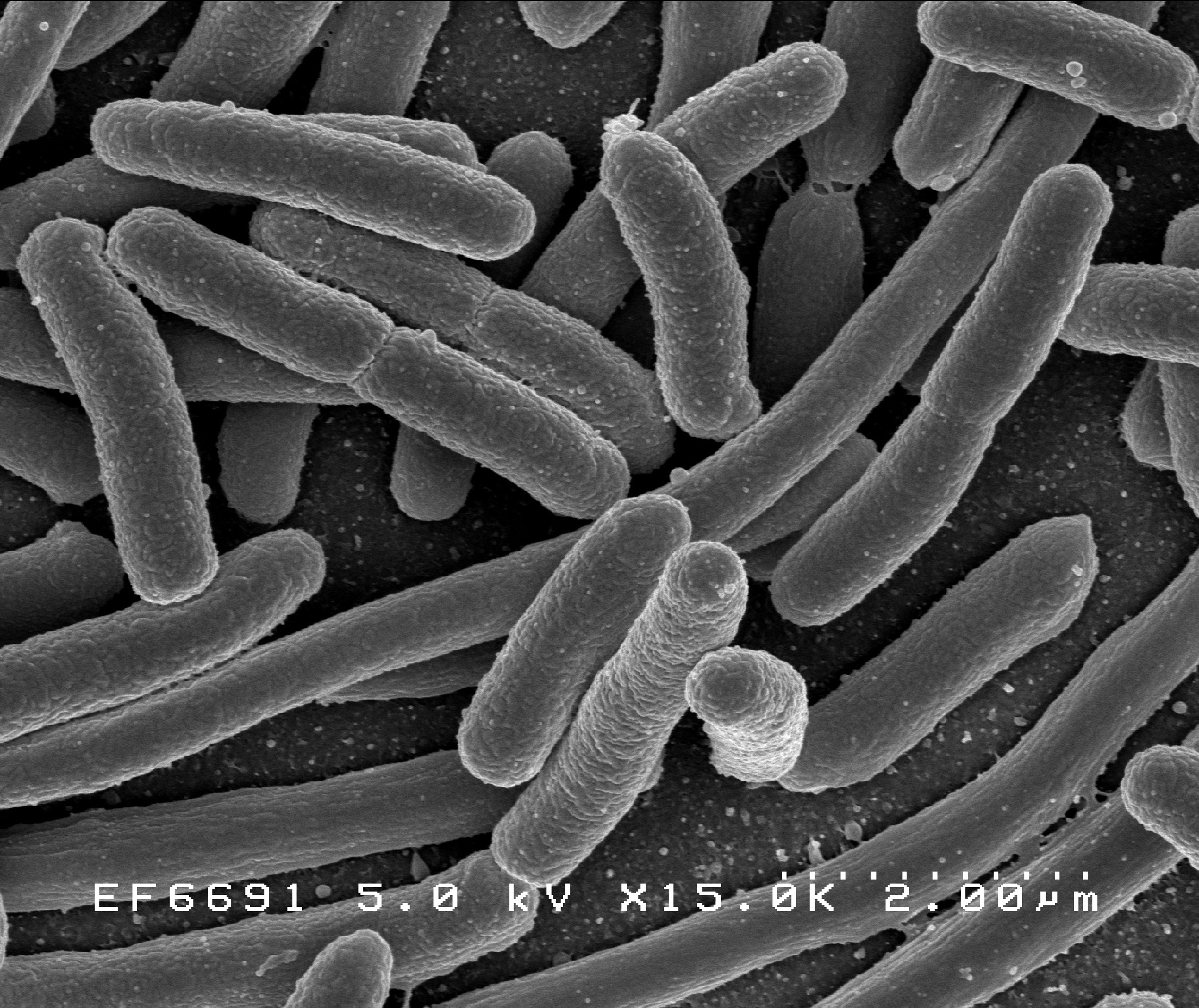
Scanned electron photograph of E.Coli

Urinary anti-infective agent, also known as urinary antiseptic, is medication that can eliminate microorganisms causing urinary tract infection (UTI). UTI can be categorized into two primary types: cystitis, which refers to lower urinary tract or bladder infection, and pyelonephritis, which indicates upper urinary tract or kidney infection. Escherichia coli (E. Coli) is the predominant microbial trigger of UTIs, accounting for 75% to 95% of reported cases. Other pathogens such as Proteus mirabilis, Klebsiella pneumoniae, and Staphylococcus saprophyticus can also cause UTIs.

The use of antimicrobial therapy to treat UTIs started in the 20th century. Nitrofurantoin, trimethoprim-sulfamethoxazole (TMP/SMX), fosfomycin, and pivmecillinam are currently the first-line agents for empiric therapy of simple cystitis. On the other hand, the choice of empiric antimicrobial therapy for pyelonephritis depends on the severity of illness, specific host factors, and the presence of resistant bacteria. Ceftriaxone is often considered for parenteral treatment, while oral or parenteral fluoroquinolones, such as levofloxacin and ciprofloxacin, are suitable alternatives for treating pyelonephritis.

Antimicrobial therapy should be tailored to the individual, considering factors like the severity of illness, specific host factors, and pathogen resistance in the local community.

== Types of urinary anti-infective agent ==
Urinary antiseptics are medications that target bacteria in the urinary tract. They can be divided into two groups: bactericidal agents, and bacteriostatic agents. These antiseptics help prevent infections by effectively eliminating UTI symptoms through their action on microorganisms.

=== Urinary bactericidal agents ===
==== Nitrofurantoin ====
Chemical structure of nitrofurantoin

Nitrofurantoin is regarded as the first-line agent for simple cystitis, with an efficacy rate ranging from 88% to 92%. It can also be a prophylactic agent to prevent long-term UTIs. This antibacterial medication is effective against both gram-positive and gram-negative bacteria. Nitrofurantoin exhibits its bactericidal activity through various mechanisms, including inhibiting ribosomal translation, causing bacterial DNA damage and interfering with the citric acid cycle. However, the specific role of each mechanism remains to be further explored.

When nitrofurantoin is metabolized, it converts into a reactive intermediate that attacks bacterial ribosomes, inhibiting bacterial protein synthesis. This medication is typically taken orally and has minimal systemic absorption, reducing potential side effects. Common adverse reactions associated with nitrofurantoin include brown urine discoloration, nausea, vomiting, loss of appetite, rash, and peripheral neuropathy.

==== Fosfomycin ====
Chemical structure of fosfomycin

Fosfomycin is a phosphonic acid bactericidal agent. It is commonly used as the first-line treatment for acute simple cystitis, demonstrating a 91% cure rate. It is administered orally as a single dose; In more complicated UTIs, the dose is adjusted to be repeated every three days to achieve successful eradication.

The bactericidal effect of fosfomycin is attributed to its capability to inhibit bacterial wall synthesis by inactivating an enzyme called pyruvyl transferase, which is responsible for microbial cell wall synthesis. Fosfomycin acts against gram-positive and gram-negative bacteria. Administration of fosfomycin may lead to side effects such as headache, dizziness, nausea, vomiting, and abdominal cramps.

==== Beta-lactam antibiotics ====
Chemical structure of beta-lactam

Beta-lactam antibiotics are often considered as a second-line option for treating UTIs due to their lower effectiveness compared to other antibiotics and their potential adverse effects. Commonly used beta-lactam antibiotics for UTIs include cephalosporins and penicillin. By binding to penicillin-binding proteins through their beta-lactam rings, beta-lactam antibiotics disrupt the normal function of these proteins, inhibiting bacterial cell wall synthesis, ultimately resulting in cell death.

Cephalosporins are a subclass of beta-lactam family with broad-spectrum activity against gram-positive and gram-negative bacteria. They are categorized into five generations. First and third-generation cephalosporins, like cefalexin and ceftriaxone, are more commonly used in clinical practice. Common adverse effects associated with cephalosporins include hypersensitivity, rash, anaphylaxis, and seizures.

Penicillin is another widely used subclass that effectively targets various bacteria. However, it is not regarded as the first-line treatment for uncomplicated cystitis because of the high prevalence of penicillin-resistant E. coli strains. Within the penicillin class, pivmecillinam is considered the first-line empiric treatment for acute cystitis due to its wide spectrum of activity against gram-negative bacteria and its specific efficacy in the urinary tract. It has consistently demonstrated a high cure rate of over 85% for UTIs and a low resistance rate among E. coli strains. Amoxicillin-clavulanate combination, which enhances the effectiveness of amoxicillin, is often used as an alternative for cystitis treatment when other options cannot be used.

==== Fluoroquinolones ====
Chemical structure of one of the most used fluoroquinolone - ciprofloxacin

Fluoroquinolones are a class of antimicrobial agents known for their high efficacy and broad spectrum activity against aerobic gram-positive and gram-negative bacteria. These potent antibiotics exert their bactericidal effects by selectively inhibiting the activity of type II DNA topoisomerases, which effectively halt the replication of bacterial DNA, leading to bacterial death.

Among the fluoroquinolones, ciprofloxacin and levofloxacin are used more frequently for the treatment of UTIs. These agents are well-absorbed orally and achieve significant concentrations in urine and various tissues. However, fluoroquinolones administration carries risk of GI symptoms, confusion, hypersensitivity, tendinopathy, and neuropathy. Additionally, the extensive use of fluoroquinolones has contributed to the prevalence of antimicrobial resistance in some areas. As a result, fluoroquinolones are generally reserved for more serious UTIs or when there are no better anti urinary-infective agent options.

=== Bacterial static agent ===
==== Sulfonamide ====
Sulfonamide is a bacteriostatic agent that competitively inhibits the bacterial enzyme dihydropteroate synthase. By acting as a substrate analog of para-aminobenzoic acid, sulfonamide inhibits folic acid production. TMP/SMX is a combination of two antibacterial agents that work synergistically to combat a wide range of urinary tract pathogens. TMP/SMX is commonly used due to its ability to achieve high concentrations in urinary tract tissues and urine. This antibiotic combination demonstrates notable efficacy in both the treatment and prophylaxis of recurrent urinary tract infections. Common adverse effects include nausea, vomiting, rash,pruritus, and photosensitivity.

== Renal dysfunction ==
Kidney disease can affect drug elimination, absorption, and distribution in the body, leading to altered serum drug concentrations. This can increase the risk of drug toxicity or suboptimal therapeutic effects. As a result, dosage adjustments are necessary for patients who fail to achieve the desired therapeutic serum drug levels.

=== Management ===
The choice of urinary anti-infective agents for patients with renal dysfunction is generally similar to that for individuals with normal kidney function. However, in cases where the patient's glomerular filtration rate (GFR) decreases to less than 20 mL/min, drug dosages adjustment is necessary because achieving the desired therapeutic serum drug levels becomes challenging in such patients.

=== Medication safety ===
Some drugs need to be used with caution in patients with renal dysfunction. The use of nitrofurantoin is contraindicated in patients with an estimated GFR of less than 30 mL/min/1.73m^{2} as drug accumulation can lead to increased side effects and impaired recovery of the urinary tract, increasing the risk of treatment failure. The use of TMP/SMX also raises concerns in patients with kidney disease. In patients with creatinine clearance less than 50 mL/min, the urine concentrations of SMX may decrease to subtherapeutic levels. Therefore, in patients with low creatinine clearance, it is recommended to prescribe a reduced dosage of TMP alone.

== Pregnancy ==
Pregnant women with UTIs are at a higher risk of experiencing recurrent bacteriuria and developing pyelonephritis compared to non-pregnant individuals. Untreated UTIs during pregnancy can lead to adverse outcomes, including preterm birth and low birth weight infants.

=== Management ===
Antimicrobial treatment should be adjusted for UTIs in pregnant women to avoid potential side effects brought to fetus. For acute cystitis and pyelonephritis in pregnant women, empiric antibiotic treatment is often initiated. Commonly used antibiotics for uncomplicated cystitis include amoxicillin-clavulanate and fosfomycin, while parenteral beta-lactams are preferred for acute pyelonephritis. These options are chosen because they are considered safer in pregnancy and have a relatively broad spectrum of activity. Typically, an antimicrobial course of five to seven days is given. This duration is chosen to minimize fetal exposure to antimicrobials while ensuring optimal treatment outcomes.

=== Medication safety ===
The type of urinary anti-infective agents should be carefully chosen for pregnant women with UTIs due to the potential impact on fetal development. Penicillins, cephalosporins, and fosfomycin are safe options during pregnancy. Nitrofurantoin is typically avoided during the first trimester due to uncertain associations with congenital anomalies. TMP/SMX should also be avoided as it may be associated with impaired folate metabolism, which increases the risk of neural tube defects. However, when all alternative antibiotics are contraindicated, nitrofurantoin and TMP/SMX become the last resort at the expense of the fetus. Fluoroquinolones should be avoided during pregnancy as they are associated with bone and cartilage toxicity in developing fetuses.

== Pediatrics ==
Urinary tract infection in pediatric patients is a significant clinical issue, affecting approximately 7% of fevered infants and children. If left untreated, the infection can ascend from the bladder to the kidneys, resulting in acute pyelonephritis, which leads to hypertension, kidney scarring, and end-stage kidney disease.

=== Management ===
The choice of urinary anti-infective agents used in pediatric patients and the duration of therapy depend on the types of UTIs they are suffering from. The dosage of antibiotics used in children is typically weight-dependent. Generally, oral or parenteral cephalosporins are recommended as the first-line agent for children older than two months. Second-line therapy should be considered for patients who have poor response to first-line treatment. Alternative choices include amoxicillin-clavulanate, nitrofurantoin, TMP/SMX, and ciprofloxacin.

For the treatment of simple cystitis in children, a five-day oral course of cephalexin is the preferred choice. As for children with suspected pyelonephritis, a ten-day treatment regimen is recommended. In such cases, a third-generation cephalosporin, such as cefdinir, is suggested as an appropriate option. If second-line therapy is initiated in pediatric patients with suspected pyelonephritis, ciprofloxacin should be the preferred option among the four alternatives. Nitrofurantoin may not be adequate in treating upper urinary tract infections, while TMP/SMX and amoxicillin-clavulanate should be used with caution due to the risk of kidney scarring in these patients.

=== Medication safety ===
The choice of urinary anti-infective agents in pediatric patients may differ from that in adults due to the potential harm they can cause to children. For example, the systemic use of fluoroquinolones is not appropriate in pediatric patients due to the potential risk of musculoskeletal toxicity.

== History ==
The discovery of antimicrobial agents contributed significantly to UTI management during the 20th century. Nitrofurantoin emerged as the first practical and safe urinary antimicrobial agent, but it was with limited spectrum of activity. Subsequently, in the 1970s, beta-lactam antibiotics and TMP/SMX became available for UTI therapy. Antimicrobial resistance was developed to these agents due to their widespread and extensive usage, which restricted their clinical efficacy in UTI management. Fluoroquinolones emerged during the 1980s and were recommended as an alternative when resistance to TMP/SMX reaches 10% or higher. The evolving landscape of drug resistance will continue to influence the development and application of antimicrobial agents in UTI therapy.

== See also ==
- UTI vaccine
- Uromune
- Methenamine
- LACTIN-V
- TOL-463
