= Boric acid (vaginal) =

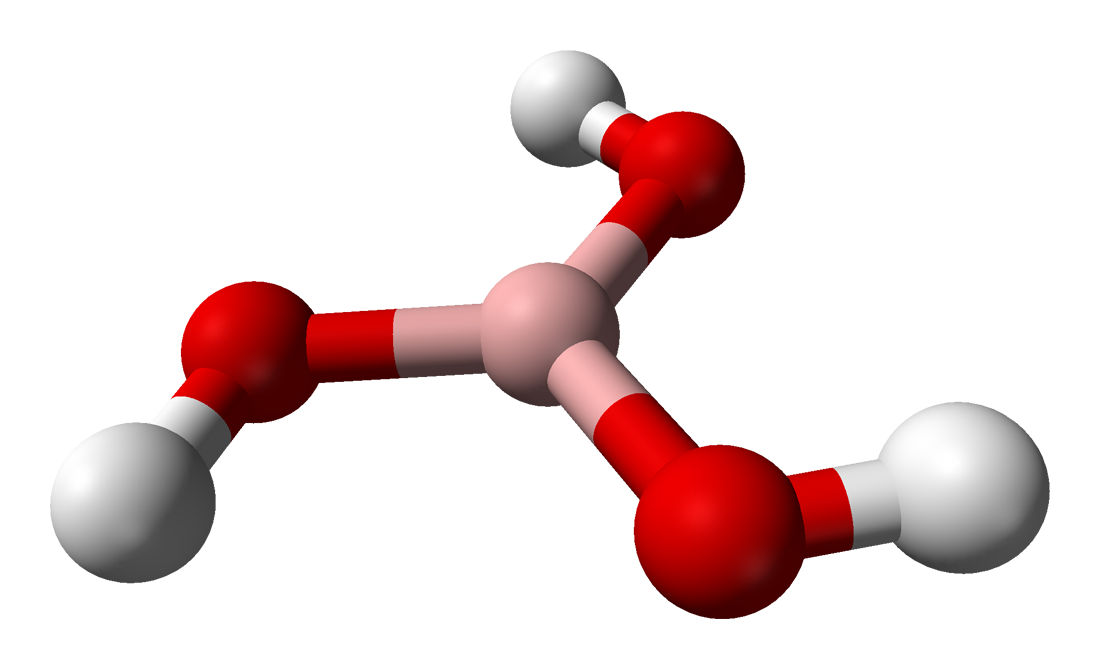

Clinical data
- Other names: Orthoboric acid; Trihydroxyborane; Trihydroxydoboron; Hydrogen orthoborate; Boracic acid; Trihydroxyboron; B(OH)_{3}
- Routes of administration: Vaginal (capsule, suppository)
- Drug class: Antiseptic; Antibacterial; Antifungal
- ATC code: S02AA03 (WHO) D08AD

Pharmacokinetic data
- Bioavailability: Oral: 100% Vaginal: ~6% Transdermal: minimal (intact but not damaged skin)
- Protein binding: Unknown
- Metabolism: Negligible
- Metabolites: None known
- Elimination half-life: 11–24 hours
- Excretion: Urine (≥90%), small amounts in feces, sweat, saliva

Identifiers
- IUPAC name: boric acid
- CAS Number: 10043-35-3 13813-79-1
- PubChem CID: 7628
- DrugBank: DB11326
- ChemSpider: 7346
- UNII: R57ZHV85D4
- KEGG: D01089
- ChEBI: CHEBI:33118
- ChEMBL: ChEMBL42403

Chemical and physical data
- Formula: BH_{3}O_{3}
- Molar mass: 61.83 g·mol^{−1}
- 3D model (JSmol): Interactive image
- SMILES: B(O)(O)O
- InChI: InChI=1S/BH3O3/c2-1(3)4/h2-4H; Key:KGBXLFKZBHKPEV-UHFFFAOYSA-N

Boric acid is an antiseptic used as a vaginal medication to treat vaginal infections including yeast infections, bacterial vaginosis, and trichomoniasis. It is administered as a capsule or suppository inserted into the vagina. The compound is not a pharmaceutical drug and is instead available over-the-counter. Boric acid has shown comparable effectiveness to antifungals in the treatment of vaginal yeast infections. Clinical data for other vaginal infections are more limited.

Side effects of vaginal boric acid may include watery discharge, burning, itching, redness, bleeding, and erosive changes. They are usually mild and temporary. Boric acid can produce toxic effects, including death, if taken orally and/or at very high doses. The exact mechanism of action of boric acid as an antiseptic is unclear. Chemically, boric acid is a boron compound, or a compound containing the element boron, and is also known as trihydroxyboron.

Boric acid has been used medically since ancient times, but its discovery as a chemical compound was not until the 1600s. Its antiseptic properties were reported around 1875. The compound was being used as a vaginal antiseptic by the late 1800s. Clinical studies of boric acid for treatment of vaginal infections began being published in the late 1900s and early 2000s. Despite not being a pharmaceutical drug, boric acid is widely used in the management of vaginal infections. It may be difficult to obtain in some countries.

== Medical uses ==
Boric acid is used to treat vulvovaginal candidiasis (VVC). It has been found to be similarly effective to azole antifungals like fluconazole and itraconazole in the treatment of vaginal Candida glabrata infections. The average cure rate of boric acid against vulvovaginal candidiasis has been found to be 76% (range 40–100%), whereas the average cure rate with antifungal medications was 61% (range 25–100%). For non-Candida albicans vulvovaginal candidiasis specifically, the cure rate was 72% (range 40–100%) for boric acid versus ~55% (range 25–100%) for azole antifungals. Boric acid is also used to treat recurrent vulvovaginal candidiasis, for instance as a maintenance therapy. It has been found to be equally effective to oral itraconazole for this purpose. The compound is one of the only options available for treatment of azole-resistant vulvovaginal candidiasis and is considered a first-line therapy in this context. Boric acid is recommended at a dose of 600 mg vaginally once per day for 2 to 3 weeks for acute or recurrent vulvovaginal candidiasis. It has also been used at a continuous maintenance dosage of 600 mg twice weekly for recurrent vulvovaginal candidiasis suppression.

The drug is used to treat bacterial vaginosis (BV). It is specifically used following treatment with or in combination with nitroimidazoles like metronidazole for recurrent bacterial vaginosis. Although it has been reported to be effective and is widely used for this purpose, clinical studies of boric acid for treatment of bacterial vaginosis are few and evidence is very limited. Based on unpublished data, boric acid by itself has been reported to be inadequate in the initial treatment of acute bacterial vaginosis and is not recommended for this purpose. The compound has also been used to treat recurrent bacterial vaginosis as a maintenance or suppressive therapy. It is recommended at a dose of 600 mg/day for 2 to 3 weeks for treatment of acute recurrent bacterial vaginosis. It is also suggested at a continuous maintenance dosage of 600 mg two to three times weekly for resistant or recurrent bacterial vaginosis suppression.

Boric acid has been reported to be effective in the treatment of resistant trichomoniasis. Eleven case reports of boric acid for trichomoniasis have been published. The compound was reported to be effective in some but not all of these cases. Of six cases of boric acid monotherapy for recurrent trichomoniasis, three (50%) were cured after prolonged treatment. Effective treatment may require high doses of boric acid for multiple months, for instance 600 mg twice daily for 2 months. Boric acid has also been used in combination with other agents such as metronidazole to treat trichomoniasis. It may be a particularly applicable option in females with trichomoniasis who have nitroimidazole intolerance or resistance. Boric acid may be useful in the treatment of vulvovaginal trichosporonosis as well. Boric acid for continuous maintenance therapy of trichomoniasis has not been studied.

Vaginal boric acid may be useful in treating dysbiosis and malodorous discharge in those with neovaginas, for instance transgender women. However, little evidence is available and more research is needed in this area.

Boric acid has been recommended for treatment of vaginal infections by multiple medical guidelines.

=== Available forms ===
Boric acid is usually used in the form of a gelatin or vegetable-based capsule containing 600 mg of boric acid powder. It may be difficult to obtain in some countries.

== Contraindications ==
It is recommended that vaginal boric acid be avoided by pregnant or lactating patients. It is teratogenic at sufficient doses in animals.

== Side effects ==
The most common adverse effect of vaginal boric acid has been found to be temporary vaginal burning (5%). Other side effects of vaginal boric acid have been found to include irritation, itching, redness, bleeding, and erosive changes in a small percentage of users (2.3%). Watery discharge appears to be a common and mild adverse effect of vaginal boric acid, but its frequency is unknown. Another reported side effect is a gritty sensation with sexual intercourse during treatment. The side effects of vaginal boric acid are usually mild and temporary.

The safety of topical boric acid, including its long-term safety, is under-characterized. Boric acid has known toxic properties when taken orally or at high doses. It is also a widely used pesticide. However, vaginal boric acid appears to be safe based on available data. No reports of serious toxicity with vaginal boric acid have been published since the 1880s, when extremely high doses (25 to 100 times higher than present recommended doses) were employed. Since the 1880s, only sporadic and mild side effects have been documented. This has included findings in more than 2,000 women in one study. Nonetheless, it is possible that rare but serious side effects could exist.

Boric acid may be able to cause local tissue injury due to caustic effects.

== Overdose ==
Symptoms of boric acid poisoning, for instance with large amounts of orally ingested boric acid, may include nausea, vomiting, abdominal pain, and diarrhea. More severe symptoms may include blue-green vomit, central nervous system depression, fever, headache, dermatitis or skin eruptions, a "boiled lobster" skin rash, reversible scalp hair loss, weakness, cyanosis, and kidney failure. However, most cases of oral boric acid overdose are asymptomatic. Doses of 15 to 20 grams (0.1–0.5 mg/kg) have been said to be potentially fatal in adults, but findings are inconsistent and there have been cases of individuals consuming 89 grams without death or severe symptoms. The doses of oral boric acid required for adverse effects appear to be much greater than a single 600 mg oral dose. Toxicity of boric acid has also been reported with large amounts applied topically to the skin.

The median lethal doses (LD_{50}) of boric acid in animals have been described. They have been found to be 2.7 to 4 g/kg orally in rats and 1.8 to 2.1 g/kg via intravenous or subcutaneous injection in mice.

== Interactions ==
Vaginal boric acid is thought to have a low risk of interactions with systemic drugs.

== Pharmacology ==
=== Pharmacodynamics ===
Boric acid is an antiseptic and has bacteriostatic and fungistatic effects. It has often been described as a weak or mild antimicrobial. The compound is not an antibiotic or antifungal, and in contrast to these agents, has broad-spectrum antimicrobial activity and inhibits multiple different biological processes of microorganisms. As a result, antimicrobial resistance is less likely to develop to boric acid. It has been reported to specifically be active against the gram-positive and gram-negative bacteria, bacteria like staphylococci and streptococci, and the fungi Candida spp. (including Candida albicans and Candida glabrata) and Saccharomyces cerevisiae, among others. It has been said to not be active against all pathogens, for instance mold fungus.

The exact mechanism of action of boric acid is unclear. One hypothesis is that boric acid works via vaginal acidification, raising vaginal pH and thereby creating and environment less hospitable to undesirable microorganisms. However, in studies, its antimicrobial properties have been found to be independent of pH. Boric acid can also inhibit bacterial and fungal biofilms. However, it may not be effective against pre-existing biofilms.

=== Pharmacokinetics ===
Boric acid for vaginal infections is indicated for vaginal administration and not for oral administration. Oral administration of boric acid can result in serious toxicity.

==== Absorption ====
Boric acid rapidly and completely absorbed from the gastrointestinal tract with oral administration. Its oral bioavailability appears to be almost 100%. Absorption of boric acid through intact skin appears to be minimal. However, application of boric acid to damaged skin can allow for much greater absorption.

In one study, circulating boron levels prior to treatment were undetectable (<0.04 μg/mL), and following 600–1,200 mg/day vaginal boric acid for 1 to 2 weeks, boron levels increased to 0.42 μg/mL. For comparison, normal circulating boron levels are 0.1 to 80 μg/mL, acute boric acid toxicity has been associated with levels of 5.4 to 1,000 μg/mL, concentrations of 80 to 126 μg/mL have been observed without toxicity symptoms or signs, and boric acid levels of less than 200 μg/mL are thought to be safe by many researchers. Based on a case study of one healthy woman in the study, who had boron levels of 0.1 to 0.15 μg/mL, it was estimated that 6% of vaginally administered boric acid is absorbed systemically. Other studies have found undetectable boric acid levels with vaginal boric acid, though the detection threshold may not have been sensitive enough or was not reported at all.

==== Distribution ====
Following absorption, boric acid is widely distributed throughout the body. It has shown accumulation in the brain, liver, and kidneys. Its volume of distribution is 0.17 to 0.5 L/kg in humans. The plasma protein binding of boric does not appear to have been reported and hence is unknown.

==== Metabolism ====
Boric acid does not undergo appreciable metabolism. No metabolites of boric acid are known.

==== Elimination ====
Boric acid is rapidly and primarily eliminated in urine. It is excreted 50% in urine within 12 hours and 90% in urine within 4 days. Small amounts of boric acid are excreted in feces, sweat, and saliva.

Following intravenous injection of 600 mg boric acid in healthy men, the elimination half-life was found to be 21 hours. On the basis of one woman in a study, the elimination half-life of boric acid with vaginal administration has been found to be 10.5 hours. In cases of human poisoning, the elimination half-life of boric acid was 13 to 24 hours.

== Chemistry ==
Boric acid is usually in the form of white crystals, scales, or a white powder. It is colorless, odorless, non-irritating, and does not stain.

The compound is a weak acid. The alkali salts of boric acid are alkaline.

== History ==
Boric acid has been used medically since ancient times. Its discovery in modern times is attributed to the German chemist Johann Joachim Becher in the 1600s. The compound was first prepared, from borax, by the Dutch chemist William Homberg in 1702, and he is often incorrectly said to be the discoverer of boric acid. He marketed it for medical use under the brand name "Homberg's sedative salt" and it was claimed to have sedative, anodyne (analgesic), and antispasmodic effects. Boric acid was first used as an antiseptic in Sweden under the brand names Aseptin (a powder) and Aseptin Amykos (a liquid) and its antiseptic properties were reported and confirmed by British surgeon and scientist Joseph Lister in 1874 and 1875. Subsequently, it became widely used for topical application for its antiseptic properties. It was first used as an intravaginal antiseptic by the late 1800s. The compound was originally thought to be benign and non-toxic, but the toxicity of boric acid became more well known with the publication of serious adverse effects in 1899.

The first clinical study of boric acid for treatment of vulvovaginal candidiasis was published in 1974. Use of boric acid for treatment of Torulopsis glabrata vaginitis was first reported by 1990. A phase 2/3 clinical trial of boric acid versus metronidazole, the Boric Acid, Alternate Solution for Intravaginal Colonization (BASIC) study, was registered in 2014 and was completed in 2016, but the results do not appear to have been published. Clinical studies of boric acid for bacterial vaginosis have been published, but no clinical trials have been published as of 2015.

== Society and culture ==
=== Names ===
Boric acid is the generic name of the compound and its JAN. It does not appear to have an INN, USAN, USP, or BAN. Boric acid has also been known as boracic acid or as orthoboric acid.

=== Availability ===
Boric acid is widely available over-the-counter. The availability of unregulated over-the-counter boric acid has been argued against due to safety concerns. Some have proposed that boric acid should only be prescribed by a medical professional.

== Research ==
A combination of boric acid and the penetration enhancer ethylenediaminetetraacetic acid (EDTA) is being developed under the developmental code name TOL-463 for treatment of bacterial vaginosis and vulvovaginal candidiasis. Following treatment for 7 days, it has been found to cure vulvovaginal candidiasis at rates of 92% as an insert and 81% as a gel and to cure bacterial vaginosis at rates of 59% for the insert and 50% for the gel. Although the bacterial vaginosis cure rates were lower, reported symptom resolution was high for both conditions, with rates of 69 to 93%.

== Veterinary medicine ==
Boric acid has toxic effects in animals similarly to humans and can result in pet poisonings.

== See also ==
- Povidone-iodine
- Dequalinium chloride
- Hydrogen peroxide
- LACTIN-V
- Methenamine
