= UTI vaccine =

Vaccine to prevent urinary tract infections

A UTI vaccine is a vaccine used for prevention of recurrent urinary tract infections (UTIs). A number of UTI vaccines have been developed and/or marketed. These include Uromune (MV-140; sublingual spray), UroVaxom (OM-89, OM-8980; oral tablet), Solco-Urovac (Strovac; vaginal suppository or intramuscular injection), ExPEC4V (V10, JNJ-63871860; intramuscular injection), and SEQ-400 (route unspecified).

== Background ==
Recurrent UTIs are common in women, causing significant physical and emotional distress. While antibiotics are widely used to treat them, the recurrence of UTIs poses a significant challenge. Long-term antibiotic use not only poses health risks but also contributes to the growing problem of antibiotic resistance, making effective treatment more challenging.

== Uromune (MV-140) ==
Uromune (developmental code name MV-140) is a vaccine developed to treat recurrent UTIs that is made from heat-inactivated bacteria mixed with in glycerol, sodium chloride, artificial pineapple flavoring, and water. It contains specific strains of four types of bacteria: Escherichia coli, Klebsiella pneumoniae, Enterococcus faecalis, and Proteus vulgaris.

This vaccine is taken by spraying it under the tongue twice a day for three months. It is currently being tested in clinical trials. Studies suggest that MV140 works by stimulating the immune system to produce antibodies and activate certain immune cells, which help protect against UTIs.

In a conducted study involving 89 individuals with a history of urinary tract infections (UTIs), participants were instructed to use two sprays of the vaccine daily for three months. Preliminary results presented at the European Association of Urology Congress in Paris revealed that nine years later, 54 percent of the participants remained free from UTIs. Women in the study remained UTI-free for approximately 4.5 years on average, while men experienced around 3.5 years without UTIs. Dr. Bob Yang, who co-led the study and serves as a consultant urologist at the Royal Berkshire NHS Foundation Trust in the United Kingdom, noted that before receiving the vaccine, all participants had struggled with recurrent UTIs, which can be challenging to treat.

== Regulatory status ==
UTI vaccines are approved for medical use in some countries or are available via special-access programs. However, UTI vaccines remain in the experimental stage of development in much of the world and remain to be approved by the Food and Drug Administration (FDA) in the United States.

== See also ==
- Methenamine
- LACTIN-V
- TOL-463
