= Methenamine/sodium salicylate =

Over-the-counter UTI drug

- Chemical structure of methenamine

- Chemical structure of sodium salicylate

Combination of
- Methenamine: Urinary antiseptic and antibacterial
- Sodium salicylate: Nonsteroidal anti-inflammatory drug (NSAID) and analgesic

Clinical data
- Trade names: Cystex, others
- Other names: Sodium salicylate/methenamine; Methenamine/salicylate; Methenamine/salicylic acid; Salicylate/methenamine; Salicylic acid/methenamine; Hexamine/sodium salicylate; Hexamine/salicylate
- AHFS/Drugs.com: Multum Consumer Information
- Routes of administration: Oral
- ATC code: G04BX17 (WHO)

Legal status
- Legal status: US: OTC

Methenamine/sodium salicylate, sold under the brand name Cystex among others, is a combination drug comprising methenamine and sodium salicylate. Methenamine serves as a urinary antiseptic and antibacterial agent, while sodium salicylate is a nonsteroidal anti-inflammatory drug (NSAID) and analgesic. The combination is used for the treatment and prevention of urinary tract infection (UTI) symptoms.

== Medical uses ==
Methenamine, whether used alone or in combination with sodium salicylate, is considered an alternative to antibiotics for the treatment and prevention of UTIs and related symptoms. Unlike antibiotics, methenamine does not contribute to the risk of bacterial resistance.

=== Available forms ===
The drug is available over-the-counter (OTC), including in the United States, and is typically taken by mouth three times per day.

Methenamine/sodium salicylate is marketed under several brand names, including Cystex Urinary Pain Relief, AZO Urinary Tract Defense, Uro-Pain Dual Action, and CVS Antibacterial Plus Urinary Pain Relief. Some formulations also include phenazopyridine and are marketed as products like the All-In-One UTI Emergency Kit.

=== Comparison with methenamine ===
Methenamine is also available as a prescription drug and is used alone to prevent recurrent UTIs. Clinical evidence supports its efficacy for this indication. Prescription methenamine is usually administered as the hippuric acid or mandelic acid salt, while the OTC methenamine/sodium salicylate formulation uses methenamine as the free base.

Compared to prescription methenamine, the OTC combination formulation contains lower doses of methenamine. This OTC version has been studied less extensively, and limited clinical data are available to guide its use.

== See also ==
- Boric acid
