= Solco-Urovac =

Vaccine description
- Target: Escherichia coli (4 strains), Klebsiella pneumoniae, Proteus mirabilis, Proteus morganii, and Enterococcus faecalis
- Vaccine type: Inactivated

Clinical data
- Trade names: Solco-Urovac; Strovac
- Routes of administration: Vaginal (suppository); Parenteral

Solco-Urovac (vaginal suppository), also known as Strovac (parenteral), is a vaccine against urinary tract infections (UTIs). It contains 10 strains of bacteria known to cause UTIs, including four strains of Escherichia coli as well as Klebsiella pneumoniae, Proteus mirabilis, Proteus morganii, and Enterococcus faecalis. The vaccine is administered weekly for 3 weeks, with an optional monthly booster for 3 months.

== See also ==
- UTI vaccine
