= ExPEC10V =

Vaccine description
- Target: Escherichia coli
- Vaccine type: Conjugate

Clinical data
- Other names: ExPEC10-V; ExPEC-10V; ExPECV10; ExPEC-V10; VAC-52416; VAC52416; JNJ-69968054; JNJ69968054
- Routes of administration: Intramuscular injection

ExPEC10V, also known as VAC-52416 or JNJ-69968054, is a vaccine against Escherichia coli infection. It is an Escherichia coli polysaccharide conjugate vaccine. The vaccine is administered by intramuscular injection. It is being developed by Janssen Pharmaceuticals. As of April 2023, ExPEC10V is in phase 3 clinical trials. It is under development towards approval in the United States, Europe, and Japan. The vaccine is a 10-valent form of the earlier ExPEC4V.

== See also ==
- UTI vaccine
