= SEQ-400 =

Vaccine description
- Target: Escherichia coli

Clinical data
- Other names: SEQ400
- Routes of administration: Unspecified

SEQ-400 is a vaccine against urinary tract infections (UTIs) which is under development for potential medical use. It is a vaccine against the Escherichia coli FimH adhesin protein, which is essential for bacterial infection. The vaccine is being developed by Sequoia Sciences. As of September 2023, it is in phase 2 clinical trials. SEQ-400 is being developed for potential approval and use in the United States.

== See also ==
- UTI vaccine
