= ExPEC4V =

Vaccine description
- Target: Escherichia coli
- Vaccine type: conjugate

Clinical data
- Other names: ExPEC4-V; ExPEC-4V; ExPECV4; ExPEC-V4; JNJ-63871860; JNJ63871860
- Routes of administration: Intramuscular injection

ExPEC4V, also known as JNJ-63871860, is a vaccine against urinary tract infections (UTIs) and Escherichia coli infection. It is an Escherichia coli polysaccharide conjugate vaccine. The vaccine is administered by intramuscular injection. It is being developed by GlycoVaxyn and Johnson & Johnson. As of November 2023, ExPEC4V is in phase 2 clinical trials. There is also a 10-valent form called ExPEC10V (VAC-52416; JNJ-69968054). In February 2025 Johnson & Johnson stopped the Phase III trial of ExPEC after interim results found it failed to demonstrate efficacy over placebo.

== See also ==
- UTI vaccine
