= UroVaxom =

Vaccine description
- Target: Escherichia coli
- Vaccine type: Inactivated

Clinical data
- Trade names: UroVaxom
- Other names: OM-89; OM-8980
- Routes of administration: Oral (tablet)

UroVaxom (developmental code names OM-89, OM-8980) is a vaccine against urinary tract infections (UTIs). It is an extract of 18 strains of killed Escherichia coli administered as an oral tablet once daily for 3 months. The vaccine is marketed for use in the prevention of recurrent UTIs in some European countries. It was also being studied for treatment of prostatitis but was discontinued. UroVaxom was initially developed in the 1980s.

== See also ==
- UTI vaccine
