= TOL-463 =

Combination drug

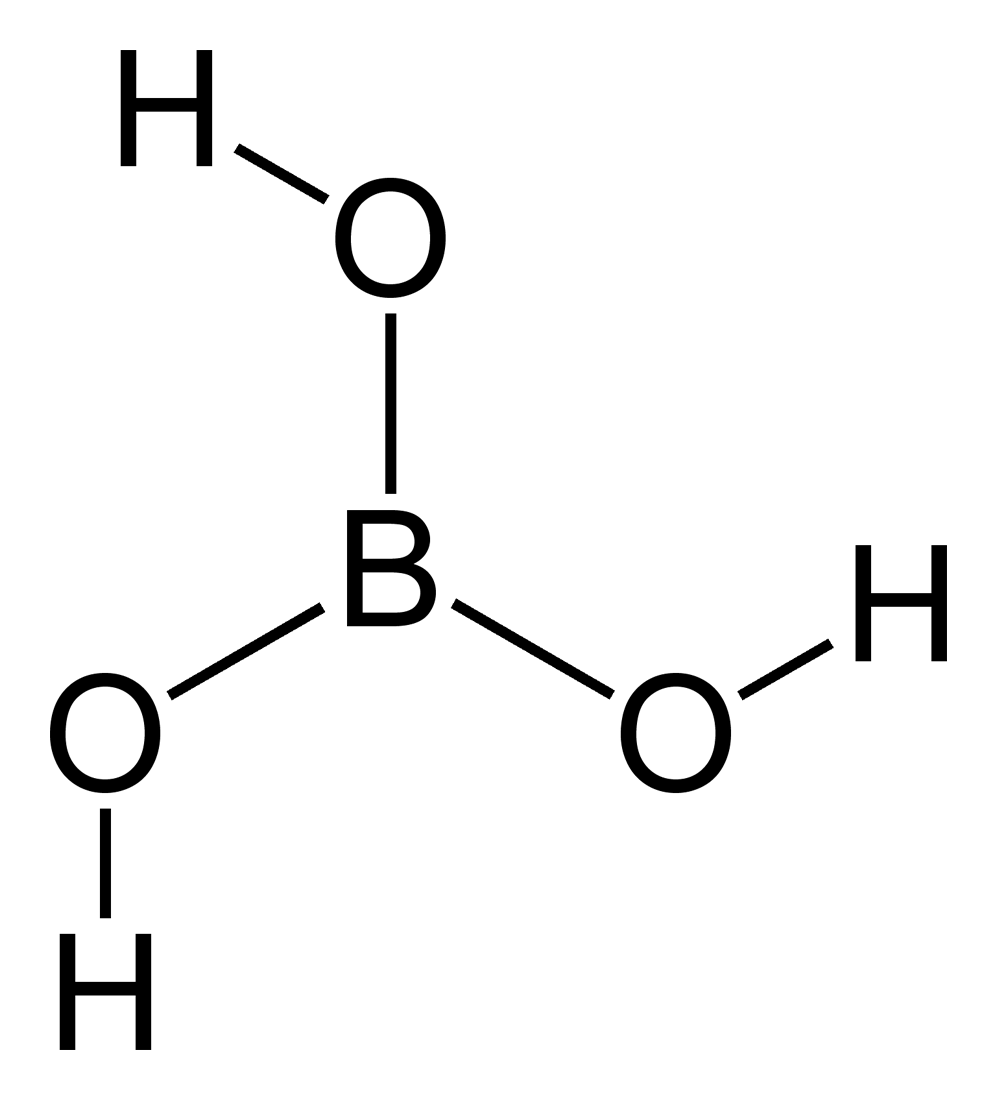

- boric acid (top) and EDTA (bottom)

Combination of
- Boric acid (vaginal): Antiseptic, antifungal
- EDTA: Antimicrobial enhancer

Clinical data
- Other names: Boric acid/ethylenediamine-tetraacetic acid; Boric acid/EDTA
- Routes of administration: Vaginal (insert, gel)

TOL-463, also known as boric acid/ethylenediaminetetraacetic acid or boric acid/EDTA, is an anti-infective medication which is under development for the treatment of bacterial vaginosis (BV) and vulvovaginal candidiasis (VVC) (vaginal yeast infection). It is a boric acid-based vaginal anti-infective enhanced with ethylenediaminetetraacetic acid (EDTA) which was designed to have improved activity against vaginal bacterial and fungal biofilms while sparing protective lactobacilli. EDTA enhances the antimicrobial activity of boric acid and improves its efficacy against relevant biofilms.

In a small phase 2 randomized controlled trial, TOL-463 as an insert or gel achieved clinical cure rates of 50 to 59% against BV and 81 to 92% against VVC in women who had one or both conditions. It was effective and safe in the study, though it was without indication of superiority over other antifungal medications for VVC. The cure rates against BV with TOL-463 were said to be comparable to those with recently approved antibiotic treatments like single-dose oral secnidazole (58%) and single-dose metronidazole vaginal gel (41%).

As of July 2022, TOL-463 is in phase 2 clinical trials for the treatment of BV and VVC. It was originated by Toltec Pharmaceuticals and is under development by Toltec Pharmaceuticals and the National Institute of Allergy and Infectious Diseases. There have been no developmental updates since May 2019.

== See also ==
- LACTIN-V
