= LACTIN-V =

Clinical data
- Other names: CTV-05; CTV05; Lactobacillus crispatus CTV-05

Legal status
- Legal status: Investigational

Identifiers
- PubChem SID: 482028468
- DrugBank: DB19093
- UNII: RP8X0ZB061

LACTIN-V, also known as CTV-05 or as Lactobacillus crispatus CTV-05, is a live biopharmaceutical medication containing a strain of Lactobacillus crispatus (L. crispatus) which is under development for the treatment of urinary tract infections (UTIs) and bacterial vaginosis (BV). It is administered intravaginally and is described as the first vaginal microbiome (VMB)-based live biotherapeutic product (LBP).

Depletion of hydrogen peroxide (H_{2}O_{2})-producing Lactobacillus strains such as Lactobacillus crispatus in the vagina has been strongly associated with BV and UTIs. Most commercially available probiotic Lactobacillus strains are not vaginal strains and do not appear to improve vaginal or urinary health outcomes. The Centers for Disease Control and Prevention (CDC)'s Sexually Transmitted Infections Treatment Guidelines (2021) noted that intravaginal LACTIN-V produced a considerably lower recurrence of BV following initial antibiotic treatment with metronidazole in a randomized controlled trial. However, the guidelines also noted that LACTIN-V is not yet Food and Drug Administration (FDA)-approved or commercially available.

As of December 2021, LACTIN-V is in phase 2/3 clinical trials for the treatment of UTIs and is in phase 2 trials for the treatment of BV. It was originated by GyneLogix and is under development by Osel Inc., the National Institute of Allergy and Infectious Diseases, and other organizations.

== See also ==
- TOL-463
