= Methenamine =

Urinary antiseptic drug

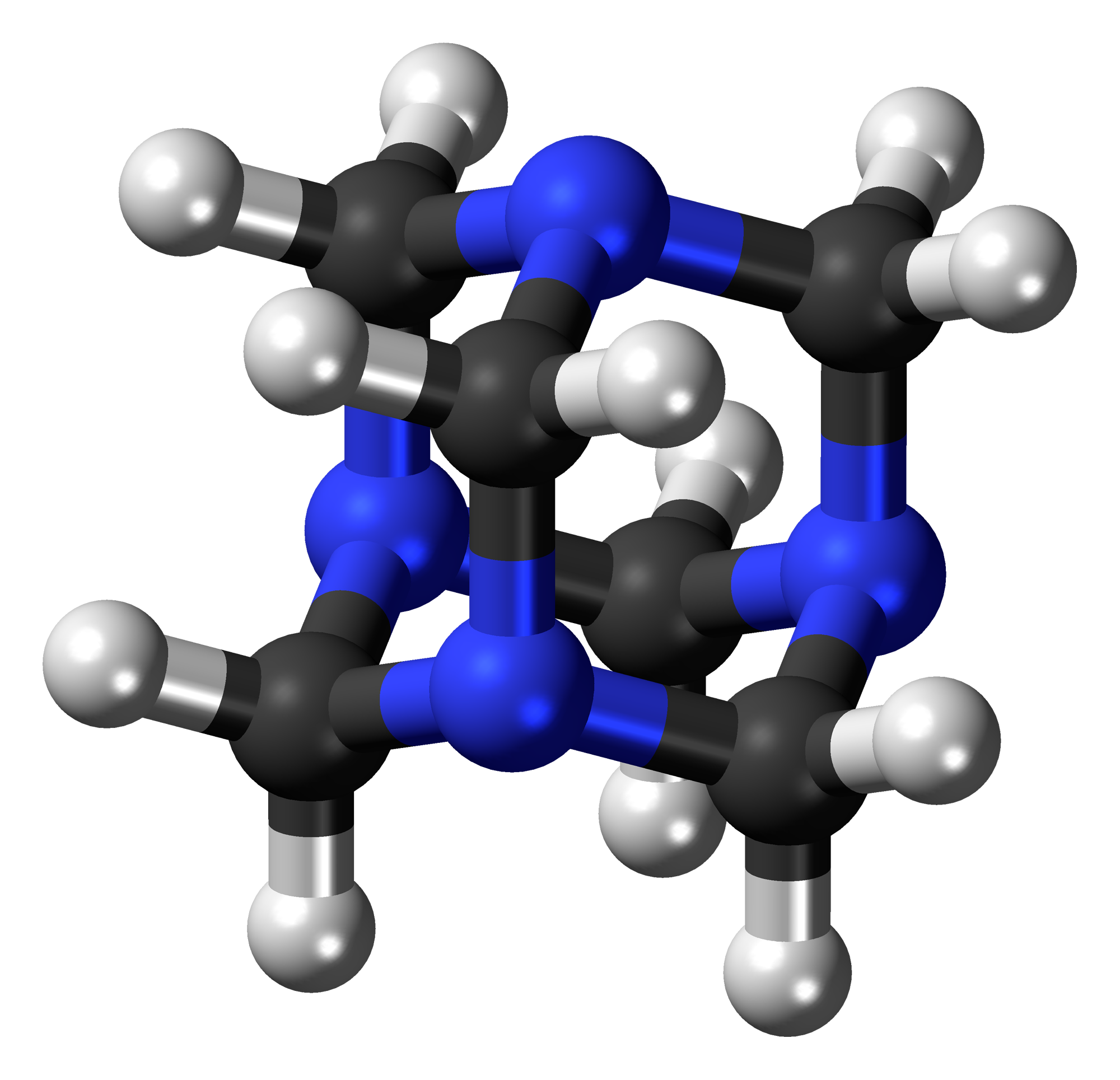

Clinical data
- Pronunciation: meh-THEH-na-meen
- Trade names: Antihydral, Hiprex, Urex, Urotropin, others
- Other names: Hexamethylenetetramine; HMTA; Hexamine; Hexamethylenamine; Hexamethyleneamine; Metenamine; Urometine; Hippramine; E-239; R-657; 1,3,5,7-Tetraazaadamantane
- Routes of administration: Oral, topical
- Drug class: Antiseptic; Antibacterial
- ATC code: J01XX05 (WHO) G04BX17 (with sodium salicylate)

Pharmacokinetic data
- Bioavailability: High (≥70%)
- Protein binding: Unknown
- Metabolism: Hydrolysis in acidic urine
- Metabolites: • Formaldehyde • Ammonia • Formic acid
- Onset of action: ≤30 minutes
- Elimination half-life: 2–6 hours
- Excretion: Urine: 70–90% unchanged within 24 hours

Identifiers
- IUPAC name: 1,3,5,7-tetrazatricyclo[3.3.1.1^{3,7}]decane
- CAS Number: 100-97-0 5714-73-8 (hippurate) 587-23-5 (mandelate)
- PubChem CID: 4101
- PubChem SID: 310264893
- DrugBank: DB06799
- ChemSpider: 3959
- UNII: J50OIX95QV
- KEGG: D00393
- ChEBI: CHEBI:6824
- ChEMBL: ChEMBL1201270

Chemical and physical data
- Formula: C_{6}H_{12}N_{4}
- Molar mass: 140.190 g·mol^{−1}
- 3D model (JSmol): Interactive image
- SMILES: C1N2CN3CN1CN(C2)C3
- InChI: InChI=1S/C6H12N4/c1-7-2-9-4-8(1)5-10(3-7)6-9/h1-6H2; Key:VKYKSIONXSXAKP-UHFFFAOYSA-N

Methenamine, also known as hexamine or hexamethylenetetramine and sold under the brand names Hiprex, Urex, and Urotropin among others, is a urinary tract antiseptic and antibacterial medication which is used in the prevention of recurrent urinary tract infections (UTIs). It is not an antibiotic, and unlike antibiotics, has no risk of bacterial resistance. Methenamine can reduce the risk of UTIs by 44 to 86% and has been found to be non-inferior to low-dose prophylactic antibiotics. It is taken by mouth. The drug is available both by prescription and at lower doses over the counter. Besides for UTI prevention, methenamine is also available in a topical form to treat hyperhidrosis.

Side effects of methenamine are generally minor and include upset stomach, nausea, and headache, among others. Methenamine is a prodrug of formaldehyde in acidic urine. Formaldehyde is a non-specific antiseptic and bactericide which works via denaturation of bacterial proteins and nucleic acids. Conversion of methenamine into formaldehyde only occurs in acidic environments and hence its actions show selectivity for tissues like the bladder and stomach. Chemically, methenamine is a simple cyclized hydrocarbon and is similar in structure to adamantane.

Methenamine was discovered in 1859 and was first introduced for medical use as a urinary antiseptic in 1895. It was formally approved for medical use in the United States in 1967. Though it became a "forgotten drug" following the discovery of antibiotics in 1928, there has been a resurgence in interest in methenamine since 2010 owing to increasing rates of bacterial resistance with antibiotics. Larger and higher-quality clinical trials of methenamine for UTI prevention have started to be published in the 2020s and it may soon be recommended by more medical guidelines. Methenamine has been found to be more cost-effective than low-dose prophylactic antibiotics for preventing UTIs.

== Medical uses ==
=== Urinary tract infections ===
Methenamine is used in the treatment and prevention of recurrent urinary tract infections (UTIs) requiring long-term therapy. It is approved and used in both adults and children at least 6 years of age. The drug can also be used in special populations including older adults, people undergoing genitourinary surgical procedures, people with long-term catheterization, and kidney transplant recipients. It has not been studied in neonates or infants. Methenamine is employed as an alternative to antibiotics. The drug is not used in the curative treatment of UTIs and should be started only after bacterial eradication by appropriate antimicrobial agents. As it is an antiseptic and not an antibiotic, methenamine has no risk of promoting bacterial resistance. Studies have administered continuous methenamine therapy usually for 12 months or less, but in some studies for as long as 2 to 10 years.

A 2012 Cochrane review found that methenamine was effective in the prevention of UTIs. The relative risk of symptomatic UTI was 0.24 and of bacteriuria was 0.56. In the case of short-term treatment (≤1 week), the relative risk of symptomatic UTI was 0.14. On the other hand, methenamine was not effective in reducing the risk of symptomatic UTI or bacteriuria in people with known renal tract abnormalities or neurogenic bladder. The quality of evidence was mixed and often poor.

A subsequent large randomized controlled trial (RCT), the "ALternatives To prophylactic Antibiotics for the treatment of Recurrent urinary tract infection in women" (ALTAR) trial, was conducted by the United Kingdom National Health Service (NHS). This study, published in 2022, reported that methenamine (hippurate) was non-inferior to daily low-dose antibiotics for prevention of UTIs. The antibiotics used in the study included nitrofurantoin, trimethoprim, and cephalexin. There was a small and non-significant numerical advantage of antibiotics over methenamine in this trial (~0.5 fewer UTIs per year), but this difference was deemed of limited clinical consequence and was considered to be outweighed by the advantages of methenamine. UTI-free rates over 12 months were 43% with methenamine and 54% with antibiotics. Besides effectiveness in terms of UTI prevention, methenamine demonstrated lower rates of bacterial resistance relative to antibiotic therapy in this trial and in other studies.

A 2024 systematic review found that methenamine was non-inferior to antibiotic prophylaxis in the prevention of UTIs in two comparative prospective clinical studies, including the ALTAR trial. Other, older studies found that methenamine was inferior to antibiotics including trimethoprim/sulfamethoxazole, trimethoprim, and nitrofurantoin in preventing or suppressing current UTIs, but these studies were of lower quality. Additional large and high-quality clinical trials of methenamine for UTI prevention are needed as of 2024. More studies are also needed in special populations like older adults. Another large RCT of methenamine for UTI prevention, the international European ImpresU trial in older women, which is comparing methenamine to placebo instead of against antibiotics, is underway as of 2022.

Methenamine is not widely recommended by medical guidelines for UTI prevention as of 2022. However, this is expected to change in the near future due to the publication of the ALTAR trial and other new high-quality clinical trials.

In addition to prescription methenamine, a lower-dose combination formulation of methenamine with the nonsteroidal anti-inflammatory drug (NSAID) sodium salicylate is available over-the-counter under brand names like Cystex for treatment and prevention of UTI symptoms. This formulation is much less-studied than prescription methenamine and little data are available to inform its use.

Methenamine is provided mainly as methenamine hippurate (the hippuric acid salt) or methenamine mandelate (the mandelic acid salt). The drug is taken twice daily in the case of methenamine hippurate and four times daily in the case of methenamine mandelate. Methenamine hippurate is more popular and commonly used owing to its more convenient dosing schedule. Methenamine is taken three times daily in the case of formulations in which low-dose methenamine free base is combined with sodium salicylate. The dosing schedule of methenamine is less convenient than once-daily low-dose prophylactic antibiotics.

=== Other genitourinary infections ===
Methenamine is converted into formaldehyde only in acidic environments like the urinary bladder and hence is not expected to be effective in the eradicative treatment of pyelonephritis (kidney infection) or chronic bacterial prostatitis. As a result, it is not recommended for such indications. However, methenamine may help to prevent pyelonephritis and hospitalization by preventing UTIs that can lead to these complications. In addition, in men with persistent or recurring chronic bacterial prostatitis, prophylactic methenamine may be useful as an alternative to low-dose prophylactic antibiotics in preventing prostatitis-derived UTIs and managing associated symptoms. Prophylactic low-dose methenamine combined with an ascorbic acid (vitamin C) supplement has been reported to be effective for this purpose based on clinical experience. In any case, supporting data for this use are lacking as of 2020.

=== Excessive sweating ===
Methenamine, in a topical cream or gel stick formulation sold under brand names like Antihydral and Dehydral, is used in the treatment of hyperhidrosis (excessive sweating) and has been reported to be clinically effective for this indication. The skin is slightly acidic and formaldehyde can be released from methenamine in this environment.

=== Available forms ===
Methenamine is provided in the form of 500 and 1,000 mg oral tablets. It is available both alone and in combination with the nonsteroidal anti-inflammatory drug (NSAID) sodium salicylate. Other combinations with other drugs, such as phenazopyridine, are also available.

Methenamine is provided pharmaceutically alone as the hippuric acid (methenamine hippurate) and mandelic acid (methenamine mandelate) salts. The free base and other salts, including anhydromethylencitrate and sulfosalicylate, have also been marketed in some countries. Methenamine mandelate is provided as an enteric coated tablet and is taken four times daily, whereas methenamine hippurate is available only in non-coated tablet form and is taken twice daily. Non-coated methenamine tablets can have a chemical taste described as sweet, sour, and/or metallic.

Methenamine is available both by prescription (by itself) and over the counter (in combinations). Over-the-counter formulations in combination with sodium salicylate (162.5 mg) contain a lower amount of methenamine of 162 mg methenamine free base per tablet compared to prescription formulations and are taken three times daily.

== Contraindications ==
The safety of methenamine in people with renal impairment is unknown and it is considered to be contraindicated in this context. Other contraindications include severe liver disease or hepatic impairment, known hypersensitivity to methenamine or the drug formulation's components, severe dehydration, hyperphosphatemia, and use of sulfonamides. Caution is also advised in people with gout. Its safety during pregnancy is unclear and it is known to enter the placenta, amniotic fluid, and breast milk. As such, discontinuation of methenamine is recommended during breastfeeding. No teratogenic effects with methenamine in animals have been observed. Although the preceding contraindications of methenamine have been specified, they are not well-defined and may not be absolute contraindications in all cases.

== Side effects ==
Side effects of methenamine are minor and infrequent, reportedly occurring in fewer than 4% of individuals. They include dyspepsia (upset stomach), abdominal pain, dysuria (painful or uncomfortable urination), nausea, vomiting, diarrhea, headache, rash, and pruritus (itching). The drug is generally very well-tolerated. Rarely, reversibly elevated liver enzymes, including of alanine aminotransferase (ALT) and aspartate aminotransferase (AST), have been reported. Normalization of liver enzymes has occurred with discontinuation or continuation of methenamine. Hypersensitivity reactions have also rarely been reported. It has been said that methenamine, overall, is very safe.

Formaldehyde is a known carcinogen, for instance being associated with nasopharyngeal cancer and leukemia. This compound also occurs in small amounts as a contaminant in alcoholic beverages, and is chemically similar to the carcinogenic ethanol (alcohol) metabolite acetaldehyde. Because of the formaldehyde exposure with methenamine, there have been concerns about methenamine's potential carcinogenicity and the possibility that it might increase the risk of cancer, for instance bladder or stomach cancer. No clinical studies have looked directly at the long-term effects of methenamine in this regard. However, there are no published case reports documenting incidence of cancer with methenamine as of 2023. Moreover, animal studies have found no evidence of long-term carcinogenicity with oral methenamine. On the other hand, the findings of animal studies of methenamine and carcinogenicity have also been questioned by some authors, though this topic is controversial.

Antibiotics are known to disrupt the gut, urinary tract, and vaginal microbiota. This has been associated with increased risk of recurrent UTIs. Methenamine has been limitedly studied in this regard, but was found in one small study to preserve urinary microbial diversity. However, more studies are needed to assess the influence of methenamine on the host microbiome, both in the urinary tract and elsewhere in the body.

Side effects of the topical form of methenamine for hyperhidrosis include dry skin, among others.

== Overdose ==
Doses of methenamine much higher than usual have been clinically studied and found to produce significant toxicity. More specifically, doses of 8 g per day (4–8-fold usual doses) for 3 to 4 weeks resulted in bladder irritation, painful and frequent urination, albuminuria (albumin in urine), crystalluria (crystals in urine), and hematuria (blood in urine). Some of these side effects are thought to be due to high levels of formaldehyde in the bladder and consequent irritation. Doses of methenamine of up to 10 to 20 g/day have also been studied and found to be tolerable without major toxicity. When methenamine was first introduced in the late 1800s and early 1900s, doses of 15 to 30 g per day were commonly employed and doses of up to 60 to 180 g per day were tried in some cases. Toxic effects of such high doses included urinary tract and bladder irritation, frequent urination, strangury, and hematuria. Animal studies employing double the modern human dosage of methenamine for 6 to 12 months found no adverse effects.

== Interactions ==
Concomitant use of methenamine and sulfonamides can result in insoluble methenamine salts precipitating in urine and hence is not recommended. Urinary alkalinizing agents, such as antacids, carbonic anhydrase inhibitors, and certain foods, may diminish the effectiveness of methenamine by making the urine more alkaline and thereby preventing the hydrolysis of methenamine into formaldehyde. Conversely, urinary acidifying agents, like ascorbic acid (vitamin C), sodium acid phosphate, and ammonium chloride, may enhance the effectiveness of methenamine by making the urine more acidic and thereby facilitating its hydrolysis into formaldehyde. Formaldehyde has been found in vitro to react with hydrochloric acid to form the highly carcinogenic compound bis(chloromethyl) ether and it may be conceivable that this might likewise occur in the stomach.

== Pharmacology ==
=== Pharmacodynamics ===
Methenamine has non-specific antiseptic and antibacterial properties in acidic environments via hydrolysis into formaldehyde. Formaldehyde is an aldehyde and is highly reactive and thereby bactericidal. It acts by binding to and denaturing bacterial proteins and nucleic acids. Methenamine is almost completely inactive as an antibacterial in alkaline environments, in which it is not degraded into formaldehyde.

The drug's spectrum of antibacterial activity includes all urinary tract pathogens. It is specifically effective against common UTI-causing bacteria including Staphylococcus saprophyticus, Escherichia coli, Enterococcus faecalis, and Enterococcus faecium. However, Klebsiella aerogenes (Enterobacter aerogenes) has been said to generally be resistant to methenamine, although the mechanism and rationale supporting this resistance have not been described. In addition, certain urea-splitting bacteria, such as Proteus and Pseudomonas species, can make the urine more alkaline, thereby potentially inhibiting the antibacterial effects of methenamine. Providencia and Morganella species are also urea-splitting and might likewise be resistant to methenamine, although this topic requires more research.

Methenamine is provided medically as the hippuric acid or mandelic acid salt, and the acid salt component plays a key role in helping to make the urine more acidic such that the activity of methenamine is optimized. Ascorbic acid (vitamin C), sodium acid phosphate, or ammonium chloride can also be supplemented to further acidify the urine. However, it is unclear whether this actually improves treatment effectiveness or not.

=== Pharmacokinetics ===
==== Absorption ====
Methenamine is rapidly absorbed from the gastrointestinal tract with oral administration. Its oral bioavailability is high (≥70%).

==== Distribution ====
The drug is distributed widely throughout the body, including in saliva, bile, cerebrospinal fluid, synovial fluids, and pleural effusions. In accordance with its presence in cerebrospinal fluid, methenamine is known to cross the blood–brain barrier and enter the central nervous system. The volume of distribution and plasma protein binding of methenamine are unknown.

==== Metabolism ====
In terms of metabolism, methenamine is hydrolyzed to form formaldehyde and ammonium in acidic urine (pH < 6). More specifically, a single molecule of methenamine decomposes into six equivalents of formaldehyde and four ammonia molecules. The drug may be degraded 10 to 30% in the acidic environment of the stomach prior to absorption. This can be avoided with enteric coated tablets. In terms of pH, there is minimal hydrolysis at a pH of 7.4, 6% at a pH of 6, and 20% at a pH of 5. The hydrolysis of methenamine occurs slowly and gradually, with approximately 3 hours required for 90% decomposition into formaldehyde. As breakdown of methenamine only occurs in acidic environments like the bladder and stomach, the activation of methenamine into formaldehyde in the body is tissue-selective. Following its formation, formaldehyde is rapidly metabolized into formic acid (formate) in the body.

==== Elimination ====
The drug is eliminated mainly by the kidneys. A single oral dose of methenamine is excreted 70 to 90% in urine unchanged within 24 hours. The onset of action of the urinary antibacterial effects of methenamine is within 30 minutes. A urinary formaldehyde concentration of 18 to 60 μg/mL can be achieved with a typical therapeutic dosage of methenamine and these concentrations of formaldehyde can inhibit almost all urinary pathogens. The elimination half-life of methenamine is 2 to 6 hours.

== Chemistry ==
Methenamine, also known as 1,3,5,7-tetraazaadamantane, is a simple cyclic hydrocarbon with a cage-like structure and is similar in structure to adamantane (tricyclo[3.3.1.1^{3,7}]decane). It is specifically the analogue of adamantane in which the carbon atoms at the 1, 3, 4, and 7 positions have been replaced with nitrogen atoms. The drug is a white or colorless and odorless crystalline compound with a sweet, sour, and/or metallic taste. It is a hydrophilic compound with a predicted log P (XLogP3) of 0.3. Methenamine is usually provided medically as the hippuric acid or mandelic acid salt. Methenamine is the cation and hippuric acid or mandelic acid is the anion.

== History ==
Methenamine was first discovered as a chemical compound in 1859. It was introduced for medical use as a urinary antiseptic under the name Urotropin in 1895. The drug was described as rapidly sterilizing and thereby restoring putrid and pus-filled urine to a normal appearance and constitution. A combination of methenamine with salicylic acid was also developed and introduced the same year. Methenamine was only used as a urinary antiseptic in cases of acidic urine, whereas boric acid was used to treat UTIs with alkaline urine. The drug name methenamine, a contraction of the chemical or scientific name hexamethylenetetramine, was formally introduced and designated by the United States Pharmacopeia (USP) by 1925 and replaced the prior name of the drug that was being used of hexamethylenamine. The alternative drug name hexamine was introduced in the British Pharmacopoeia (BP) by 1914 to be used instead of the commercial name Urotropin.

Interest in methenamine declined after the discovery of the antibiotic penicillin in 1928 and it has been described as a "forgotten drug". However, there was a surge of interest in methenamine from the 1950s to the 1980s. The drug was formally approved by the Food and Drug Administration (FDA) for medical use in the United States in 1967. The topical form of methenamine for treatment of hyperhidrosis was introduced around 1965.

Subsequently, there was another decline in interest in methenamine from 1980 until 2010. However, there has been another resurgence in interest in methenamine for recurrent UTI prevention since 2010 owing to increasing rates of bacterial resistance with antibiotics. Larger and higher-quality clinical trials of methenamine for UTI prevention, such as the United Kingdom ALTAR trial, have started to be published in the 2020s, and additional trials, such as the international European ImpresU trial, are also underway as of 2024.

== Society and culture ==
=== Names ===
Methenamine is the generic name of the drug and its INN, USAN, and USP, while hexamine is its BAN and JAN. Brand names of methenamine include Aminoform, Antihydral, Dehydral, Formamine, Formin, Hexamine, Hiprex, Hyophen, Mandelamine, Metenamine, Phosphasal, Urelle, Urex, Uribel, Urimar, Urin DS, Urogesic Blue, Urotropin, and Ustell, among numerous others.

=== Availability ===
Methenamine is approved and available in the United States. Only methenamine hippurate, the twice-daily formulation, is available as a prescription drug in the United States. Of 38 countries that were surveyed in one study, methenamine was available in seven of them. In any case, methenamine was marketed as a prescription drug widely throughout the world in 2004. The topical form of methenamine for hyperhidrosis has been marketed only in certain countries, including Austria, Canada, Germany, Luxembourg, and Switzerland.

=== Cost effectiveness ===
The costs of methenamine for long-term UTI prophylaxis can be significant. However, a 2024 study found that methenamine was more cost-effective than low-dose prophylactic antibiotics for prevention of UTIs.

== Research ==
Methenamine might be useful in the treatment of Helicobacter pylori infections as it is activated in the acidic environment of the stomach.

The drug can safely be used intravenously and might be useful in the treatment of central nervous system infections as well as certain cancers.

== See also ==
- Methenamine/sodium salicylate
- Uromune
