= Sodium salicylate =

Names
- Preferred IUPAC name Sodium 2-hydroxybenzoate
- Other names: Salsonin; Monosodium salicylate; Sodium o-hydroxybenzoate; Salicylic acid sodium salt; Monosodium 2-hydroxybenzoate; Diuratin; Enterosalicyl; Kerasalicyl; Alysine

Identifiers
| CAS Number | 54-21-7 |
| 3D model (JSmol) | Interactive image |
| ChEMBL | ChEMBL447868 |
| ChemSpider | 5689 |
| DrugBank | DB01398 |
| ECHA InfoCard | 100.000.181 |
| EC Number | 200-198-0 |
| KEGG | D00566 |
| PubChem CID | 16760658 |
| RTECS number | VO5075000 |
| UNII | WIQ1H85SYP |
| CompTox Dashboard (EPA) | DTXSID5021708 |
- InChI: InChI=1S/C7H6O3.Na/c8-6-4-2-1-3-5(6)7(9)10;/h1-4,8H,(H,9,10);/q;+1/p-1 Key: ABBQHOQBGMUPJH-UHFFFAOYSA-M; InChI=1/C7H6O3.Na/c8-6-4-2-1- 3-5(6)7(9)10;/h1-4,8H,(H,9,10); /q;+1/p-1/fC7H5O3.Na/q-1;m; InChI=1/C7H6O3.Na/c8-6-4-2-1-3-5(6)7(9)10;/h1-4,8H,(H,9,10);/q;+1/p-1 Key: ABBQHOQBGMUPJH-REWHXWOFAO
- SMILES: [Na+].O=C([O-])c1ccccc1O

Properties
| Chemical formula | C_{7}H_{5}NaO_{3} |
| Molar mass | 160.104 g·mol^{−1} |
| Appearance | White crystals |
| Melting point | 200 °C (392 °F; 473 K) |
| Solubility in water | 25.08 g/100 g (-1.5 °C); 107.9 g/100 g (15 °C); 124.6 g/100 g (25 °C); 141.8 g/100 g (78.5 °C); 179 g/100 g (114 °C) |
| Solubility | Soluble in glycerol, 1,4-Dioxane, alcohol |
| Solubility in methanol | 26.28 g/100 g (15 °C); 34.73 g/100 g (67.2 °C) |

Pharmacology
| ATC code | N02BA04 (WHO) |

Hazards
- Occupational safety and health (OHS/OSH)
| Main hazards | Harmful |
| Eye hazards | Irritant |
- GHS labelling
| Pictograms | (GHS07: Exclamation mark) |
| Signal word | Warning |
| Hazard statements | H314, H331, H400 |
| Precautionary statements | P210, P261, P273, P280, P305+P351+P338, P310 |
| NFPA 704 (fire diamond) | 1 1 0 |
| Autoignition temperature | 250 °C (482 °F; 523 K) |
- Lethal dose or concentration (LD, LC)
| LD_{50} (median dose) | 930 mg/kg (rats, oral) |
- Except where otherwise noted, data are given for materials in their standard state (at 25 °C [77 °F], 100 kPa). verify (what is ?) Infobox references

Sodium salicylate is a sodium salt of salicylic acid. It is a shiny white solid, producing mildly alkaline solutions because it can donate one hydrogen-bond and accept three.

== Synthesis ==
Sodium salicylate is industrially prepared via the Kolbe-Schmitt process, by reacting sodium phenoxide with carbon dioxide at around 120 °C and 5 atm in a mixed alcohol solvent containing excess phenol.

$\ce{C6H5O- Na+ + CO2 -> HOC6H4COO- Na+}$

This reaction proceeds via a nucleophilic addition-elimination mechanism.

Sodium salicylate can also be prepared by neutralizing salicylic acid with a sodium base such as sodium hydroxide or sodium carbonate or by refluxing methyl salicylate with sodium hydroxide.

== Uses ==
=== Medicine ===
It is used in medicine as an analgesic and antipyretic. Sodium salicylate also acts as non-steroidal anti-inflammatory drug (NSAID), and induces apoptosis in cancer cells and also necrosis. It is a potential replacement for aspirin for people sensitive to it.

Sodium salicylate lends its analgesic effects to the inhibition of cyclooxygenase. This enzyme converts arachidonic acid to cyclic endoperoxides, which are precursors to prostaglandins, thus preventing the sensitization of pain receptors.

Sodium salicylate, alongside other salicylates, has historically been used to treat rheumatological disorders.

Before the development of modern leprostatic agents in the 1940s, sodium salicylate was used as a treatment for leprosy.

=== Preservative ===
Sodium salicylate can be found in cosmetics, personal care products, perfumes, and fragrances, often as a preservative. Among 16 other salicylate salts in these products, it has been concluded to be safe.

=== Other ===
It may also be used as a phosphor for the detection of vacuum ultraviolet radiation and beta radiation.
