= Intravaginal administration =

Delivery of a substance inside the vagina

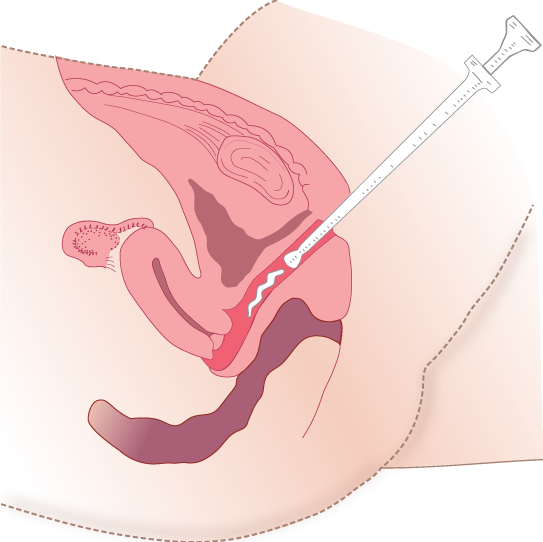
Administering a vaginal cream using an applicator.

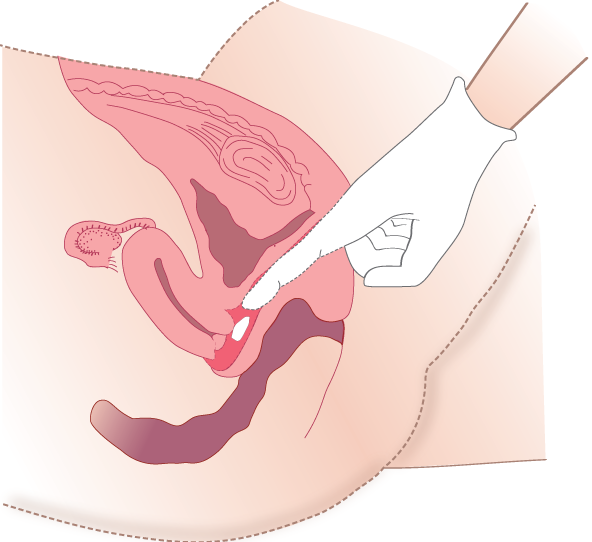
Administering a vaginal tablet without an applicator.

Intravaginal administration is a route of administration where the substance is applied inside the vagina. Pharmacologically, it has the potential advantage to result in effects primarily in the vagina or nearby structures (such as the vaginal portion of cervix) with limited systemic adverse effects compared to other routes of administration.

Formulation methods include vaginal tablets, vaginal cream, vaginal gel, vaginal suppository and vaginal ring.

It is used as an administration method for issues related to women's health, such as contraception. Medicines primarily delivered by intravaginal administration include vaginally administered estrogens and progestogens (a group of hormones including progesterone), and antibacterials and antifungals to treat bacterial vaginosis and yeast infections respectively.

Medicines may also be administered intravaginally as an alternative to oral route in the case of nausea or other digestive problems.

It is a potential means of artificial insemination (referred to as intravaginal insemination or IVI), sometimes used at home without the presence of a professional.
