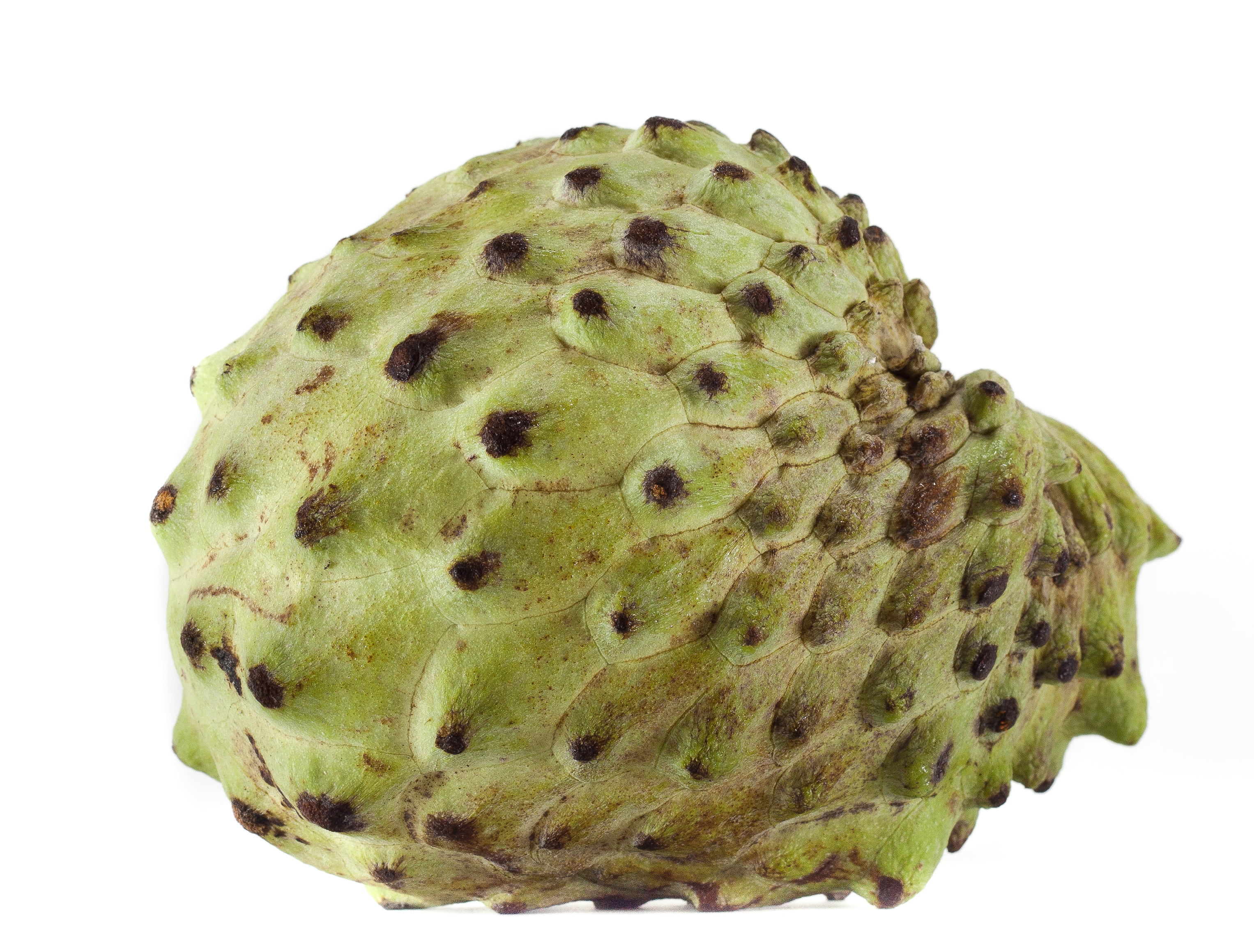

Scientific classification
- Kingdom: Plantae
- Clade: Tracheophytes
- Clade: Angiosperms
- Clade: Magnoliids
- Order: Magnoliales
- Family: Annonaceae
- Genus: Annona
- Species: A. × atemoya

Binomial name
- Annona × atemoya Mabb.

= Atemoya =

Species of fruit and plant

The atemoya, Annona × atemoya, or Annona squamosa × Annona cherimola is a hybrid of two fruits – the sugar-apple (Annona squamosa) and the cherimoya (Annona cherimola) – which are both native to the American tropics. This fruit is popular in Taiwan, where it is known as the "pineapple sugar apple" (鳳梨釋迦), so it is sometimes wrongly believed to be a cross between the sugar-apple and the pineapple. In Cuba it is known as anón, and in Venezuela chirimorinon. In Lebanon, the fruit is called achta. In Tanzania it is called stafeli dogo ("mini soursop"). In Brazil, the atemoia became popular and in 2011, around 1,200 hectares of atemoya were cultivated in Brazil. In Taiwan, the cultivating area of atemoya was 2,856.46 hectares in 2020, and Taitung County was the major place of cultivating (2,815.19 hectares).

An atemoya is normally heart-shaped or rounded, with pale-green, easily bruised, bumpy skin. Near the stem, the skin is bumpy as it is in the sugar-apple, but becomes smoother like the cherimoya on the bottom. The flesh is not segmented like that of the sugar-apple, bearing more similarity to that of the cherimoya. It is very juicy and smooth, tasting slightly sweet and a little tart, reminiscent of a piña colada. The taste also resembles vanilla from its sugar-apple parent. Many inedible, toxic, black seeds are found throughout the flesh of the atemoya. When ripe, the fruit can be scooped out of the shell and eaten chilled.

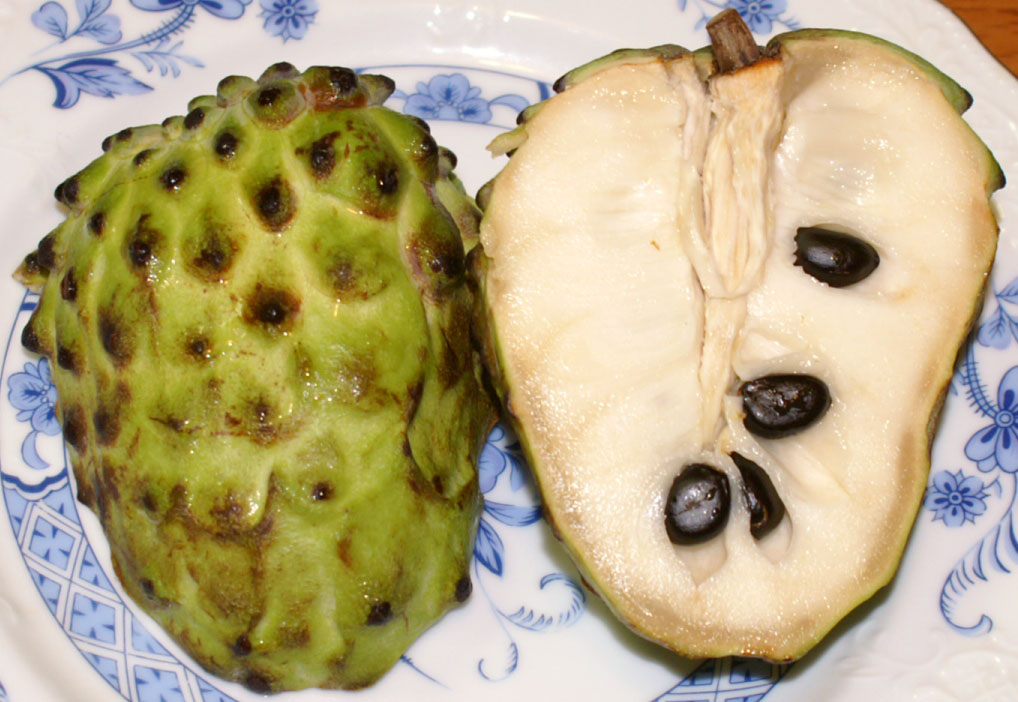
Atemoya fruit

Atemoya (Annona cherimola × squamosa) was developed by crossing cherimoya (A. cherimola) with sugar-apple (A. squamosa). Natural hybrids have been found in Venezuela and chance hybrids were noted in adjacent sugar apple and cherimoya groves in British-Mandate Palestine during the 1930s and 1940s.

The first cross was made in 1908 by P.J. Wester, a horticulturist at the USDA's Subtropical Laboratory in Miami. The resulting fruits were of superior quality to the sugar-apple and were given the name "atemoya", a combination of ate, an old Mexican name for sugar-apple, and "moya" from cherimoya. Subsequently, in 1917, Edward Simmons at Miami's Plant Introduction Station successfully grew hybrids that survived a drop in temperature to 26.5 °F (−3.1 °C), showing atemoya's hardiness derived from one of its parents, the cherimoya.

The atemoya, like other Annona trees, bears protogynous, hermaphroditic flowers, and self-pollination is rare. Therefore, artificial, hand pollination almost always guarantees superior quality fruits. One variety, 'Geffner', produces well without hand pollination. 'Bradley' also produces fair crops without hand pollination, but the fruit has a habit of splitting on the tree. Atemoyas are sometimes misshapen, underdeveloped on one side, as the result of inadequate pollination.

An atemoya flower, in its female stage, opens between 2:00 and 4:00 pm; between 3:00 pm and 5:00 pm on the following afternoon, the flower converts to its male stage.

== Cultivars ==
- Gefner: It is a very productive Israeli cultivar and is the most satisfactory variety under Florida conditions, and does not require hand pollination (in Florida) and produces fruit of good quality. The fruits reach 450 grams and are well-formed. The carpels are narrow and pointed. The pulp is white, juicy and resistant, that is, it does not allow the passage of a spoon. When chewing, the consistency resembles a chewing gum. The fruit is sweet, reaching 25 ºBx.
- Thompson : Cultivar with intermediary characteristics between sugar apple and cherimoya. The carpels are narrow, projecting and united near the peduncle. From the median part to the apex of the fruit the carpels are smooth, larger, with irregular contours but well welded. The pulp is white, succulent, and tender, with a creamy consistency, that is, it does not offer resistance to the passage of a spoon at the moment of consumption. The fruit is very sweet, reaching to 25 ºBx. It has desirable characteristics in the various aspects of production, such as good productivity, with fruits of good conformation, when pollination is perfect. Good vigor of plants and relatively tolerant to the various fungal diseases that attack plants. In the plant it is common that fruits with characteristics of the cultivar Pink's Mammoth arise, which leaves doubts on the recognition of this cultivar. It is the most cultivated cultivar in Brazil.
