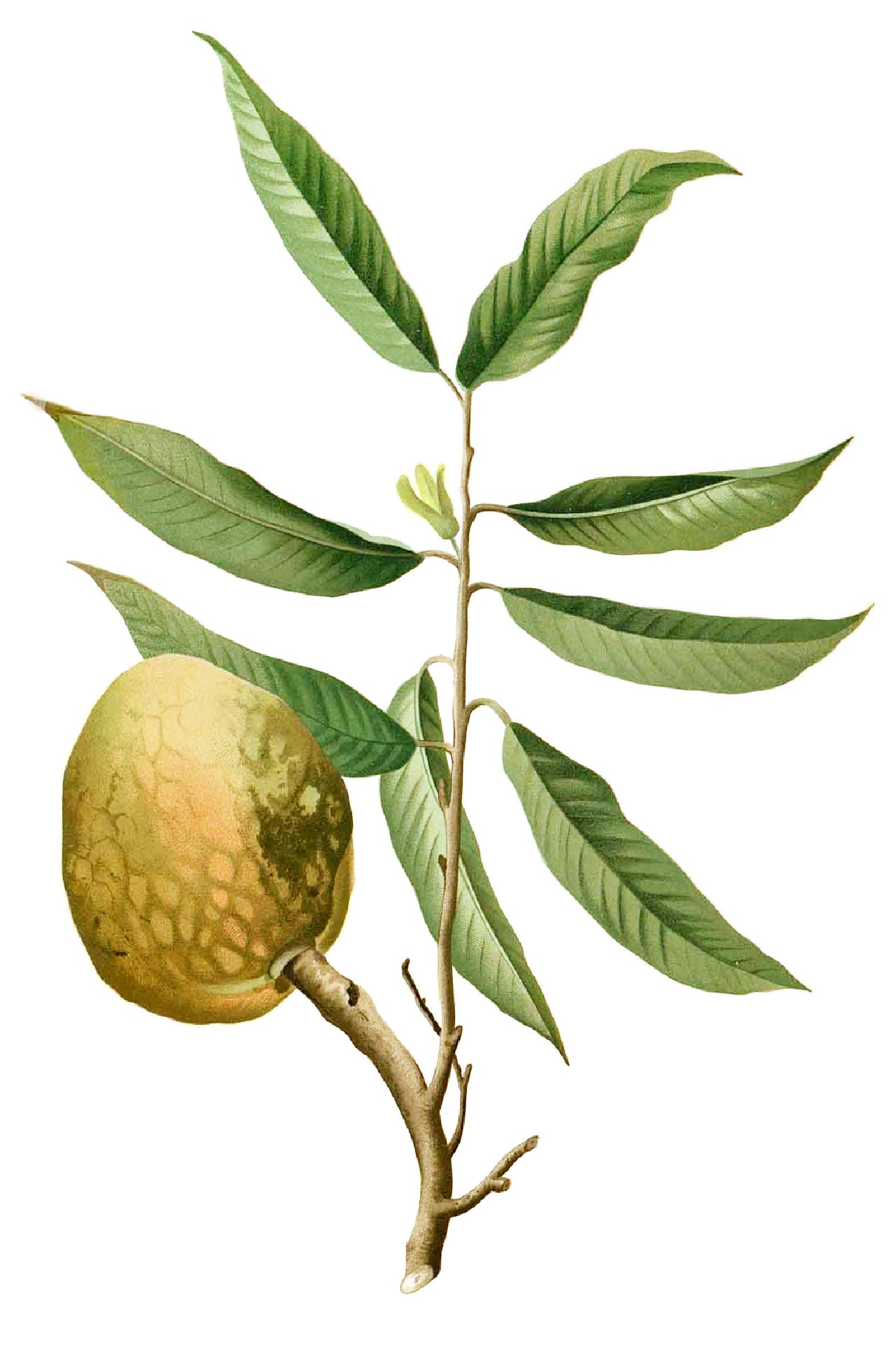
- Custard apple

Conservation status
- Least Concern (IUCN 3.1)

Scientific classification
- Kingdom: Plantae
- Clade: Tracheophytes
- Clade: Angiosperms
- Clade: Magnoliids
- Order: Magnoliales
- Family: Annonaceae
- Genus: Annona
- Species: A. reticulata

Binomial name
- Annona reticulata L.
- Native range of A. reticulata

Synonyms
- Annona lutescens Saff. Annona excelsa Kunth; Annona laevis Kunth; Annona longifolia Sessé & Moc. Annona riparia Kunth

= Annona reticulata =

Species of tree

Custard-apple, raw
Nutritional value per 100 g (3.5 oz)
- Energy: 423 kJ (101 kcal)
- Carbohydrates: 25.2 g
- Dietary fiber: 2.4 g
- Fat: 0.6 g
- Protein: 1.7 g
Vitamins and minerals
Vitamins	Quantity %DV^{†}
Thiamine (B1)	7% 0.08 mg
Riboflavin (B2)	8% 0.1 mg
Niacin (B3)	3% 0.5 mg
Pantothenic acid (B5)	3% 0.135 mg
Vitamin B6	13% 0.221 mg
Vitamin C	21% 19.2 mg
Minerals	Quantity %DV^{†}
Calcium	2% 30 mg
Iron	4% 0.71 mg
Magnesium	4% 18 mg
Phosphorus	2% 21 mg
Potassium	13% 382 mg
Sodium	0% 4 mg
- Other constituents: Quantity
- Water: 71.5 g
- Link to USDA Database entry
- ^{†}Percentages estimated using US recommendations for adults, except for potassium, which is estimated based on expert recommendation from the National Academies.

Annona reticulata is a small deciduous or semi-evergreen tree in the plant family Annonaceae. It is best known for its fruit, called custard apple, a common name shared with fruits of several other species in the same genus: A. cherimola and A. squamosa. Other English common names include ox heart and bullock's heart. The fruit is sweet and useful in preparation of desserts, but is generally less popular for eating than that of A. cherimola.

== Description ==
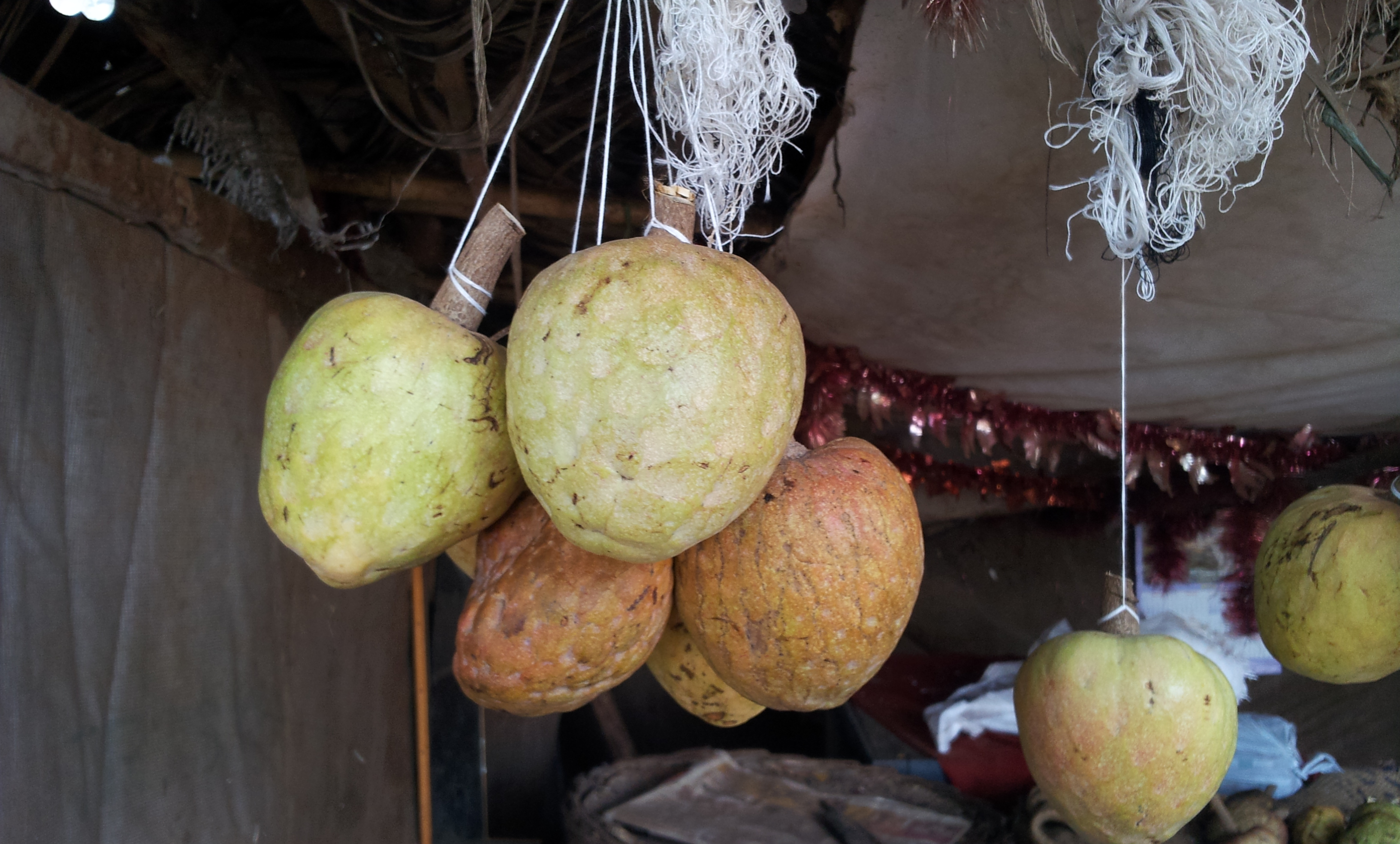
Custard apple at fruit vendor, Sangareddi, India

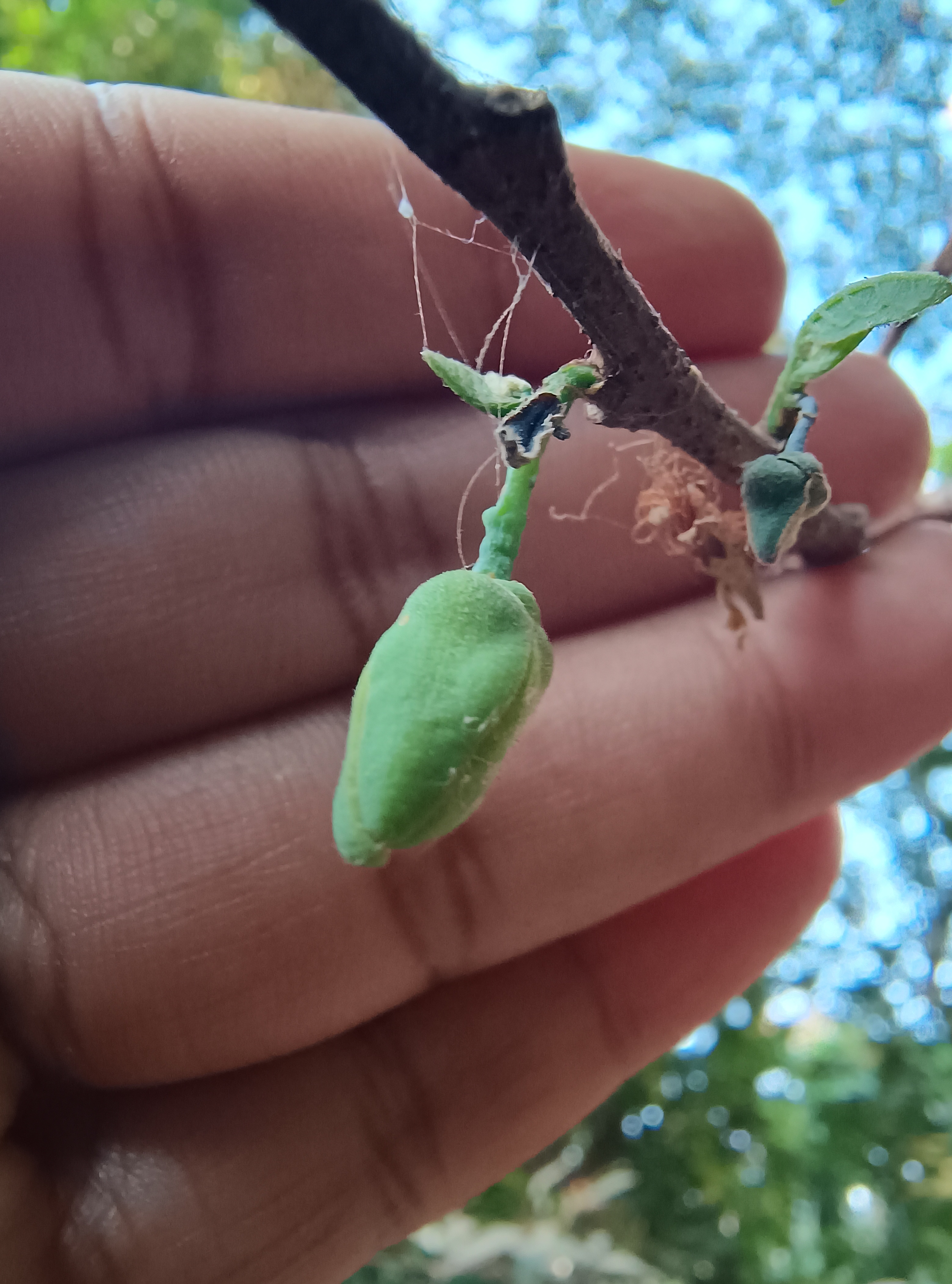
Flower bud of Annona reticulata

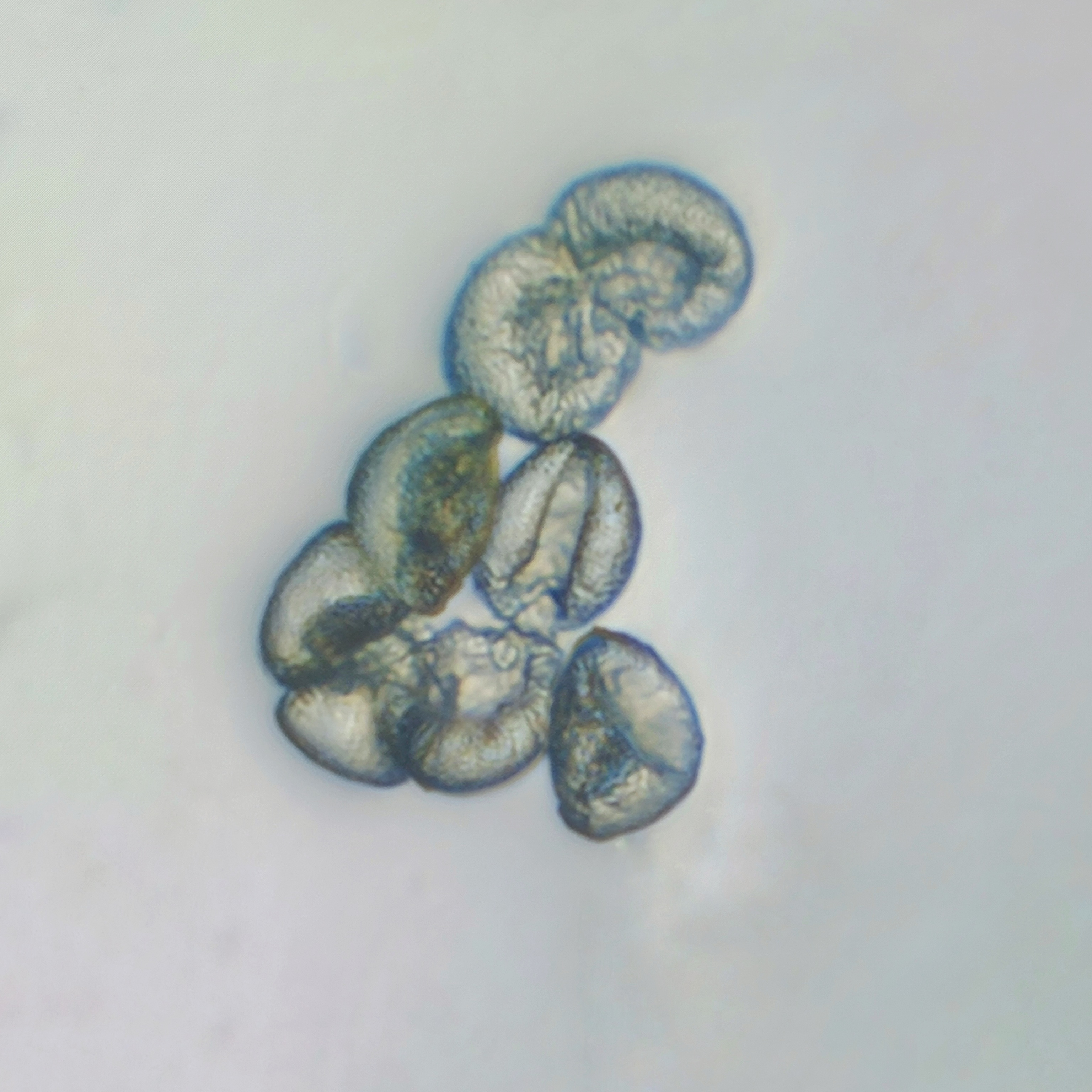
Pollen grains of Annona reticulata

It is a small deciduous or semi-evergreen tree reaching 8–10 metres (26–33 ft) tall with an open, irregular crown.

The slender leaves are hairless, straight and pointed at the apex (in some varieties wrinkled), 10–20 cm (4–8 in) long and 2–7 cm (1–3 in) wide. The yellow-green flowers are generally in clusters of three or four 2–3 cm (3/4–1 1/4 in) diameter, with three long outer petals and three very small inner ones. Its pollen is shed as permanent tetrads.

The fruits vary in shape, heart-shaped, spherical, oblong or irregular. The size ranges from 7–12 cm (3–4 1/2 in), depending on the cultivar. When ripe, the exterior of the fruit is brown or yellowish, with red highlights and a varying degree of reticulation, depending again on the variety. The flesh, which is white and pink with numerous black seeds, varies from juicy and very aromatic to hard with a repulsive taste. The flavor is sweet and pleasant, akin to the taste of 'traditional' custard.

== Distribution and habitat ==
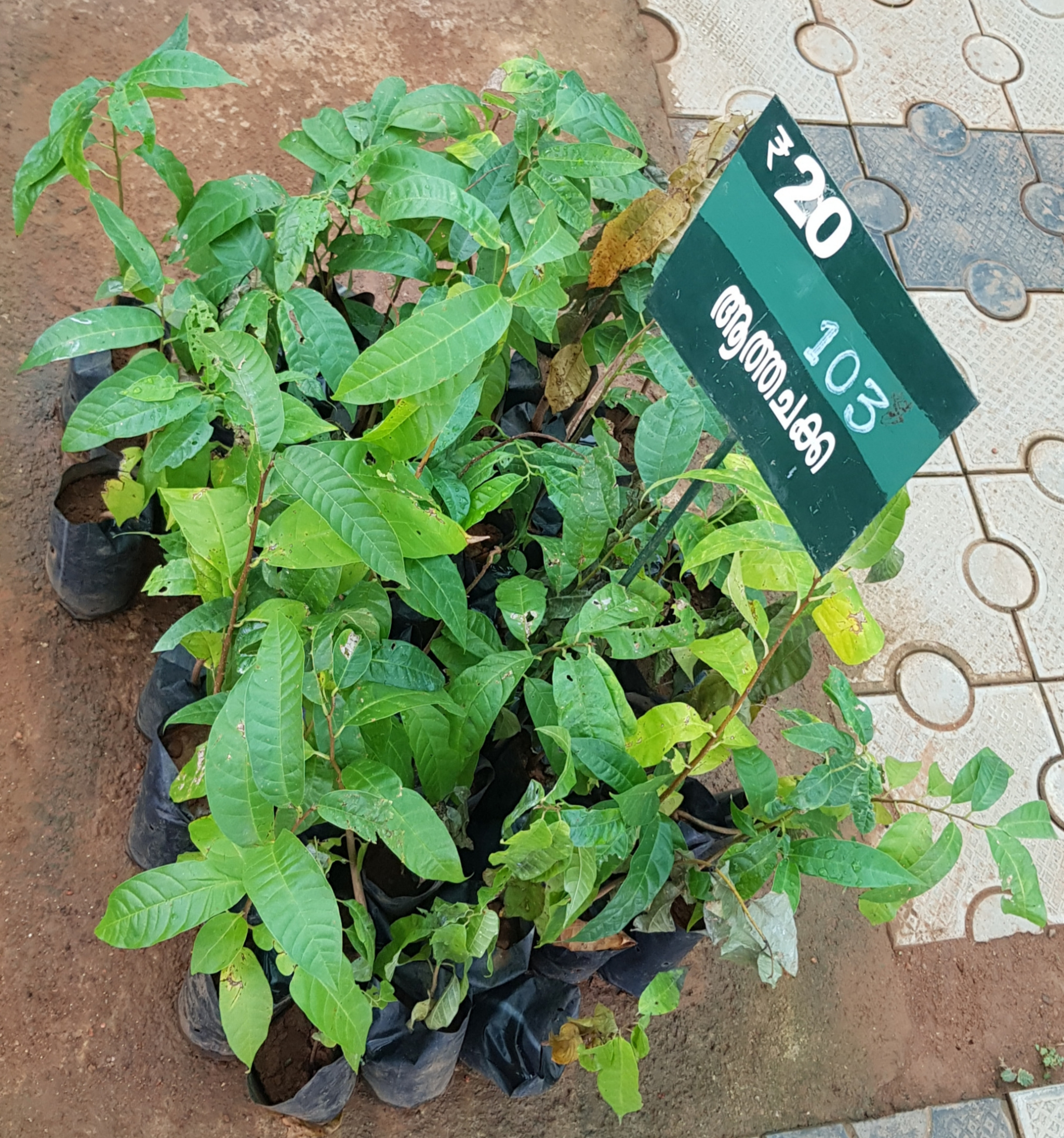
Saplings in India

Annona reticulata is native to the West Indies (Caribbean and Central America). Annona reticulata is now pantropical. It grows from sea level to elevations of 1,500 metres (5,000 ft) in areas of Central America that have alternating wet and dry seasons. It is cultivated and naturalized in many tropical places including Southeast Asia, Taiwan, South Asia, Australia, and Africa. In India, the species has migrated from initial cultivation into the wild.

== Climate ==
Although the tree grows optimally in tropic conditions, it is also found in subtropical regions. It requires humid conditions (medium to high rainfall). Compared to the other Annona, it is less drought tolerant. The annual temperature necessary ranges from 17 to 27 °C (63 to 81 °F). It tolerates light night frosts to −2 °C (28 °F). A. reticulata grows on many soil types with pH ranging from 5 to 8. It does not tolerate waterlogging or when the water table is too high.

== Cultivation ==
Seeds can be propagated. Other techniques for cultivation are grafting and budding. The tree produces 45 kg of fruits per year. In Asia, the season lasts from July to September, and in the Caribbean, it runs from February to April. Annona reticulata can take 2-3 years from planting time to harvest.

== Uses ==
=== Food ===
Custard apple can be eaten raw, out of hand as a fresh fruit. It is not as popular as the sugar apple or the cherimoya. It can also be prepared as juices, ice-cream or puddings. In India, it is cooked into a sauce.

=== Propagation ===
A. reticulata may be grown in home gardens, even though it may not be as popular as the sugar apple (A. squamosa). It has value as rootstock for superior Annona species, such as the sugar apple, especially under humid conditions. It is also a genetic resource for hybridization.

=== Other ===
The leaves and the branches can be used for tanning as they contain blue pigments. Wrappers, ornaments and hats can be made from the inner bark. The wood is soft and can be used to make utensils, even though, it is weak and of bad quality.

== Nutrition ==
In a 100-gram reference amount, custard apple supplies 423 kilojoules (101 kilocalories) of food energy, 23% of the Daily Value (DV) of vitamin C and 17% DV of vitamin B6, with no other micronutrients in significant amounts (table). Raw custard apple is 72% water, 25% carbohydrates, 2% protein, and 1% fat (table).

== Risk and impact ==
Annona reticulata is known to be an invasive plant. A PIER risk assessment gave a score of 11 for the Annona reticulata. It negatively impacts the population cultivating the crop as all parts of the tree (except the fruit) are toxic, possibly causing problems for human health.

== Diseases and pests ==
The diseases that can spread to Annona reticulata include the Anthracnose, the leaf spot, the diplodia rot and the black canker. The spiral nematode, the stunt nematode and the mealybug can also infect the plant

== Aroma and phytochemicals ==
The fragrant aroma of A. reticulata results from some 180 compounds, including the volatile compounds, alpha-pinene, myrcene, and limonene, among others. The plant is rich in tannins.

== Traditional medicine ==
Various traditional medicine uses have been reported over centuries for its dried fruits, bark, or leaves. In Jamaica and Panama, custard apple was used in traditional medicine as a decoction of the leaves, green fruit and bark.
