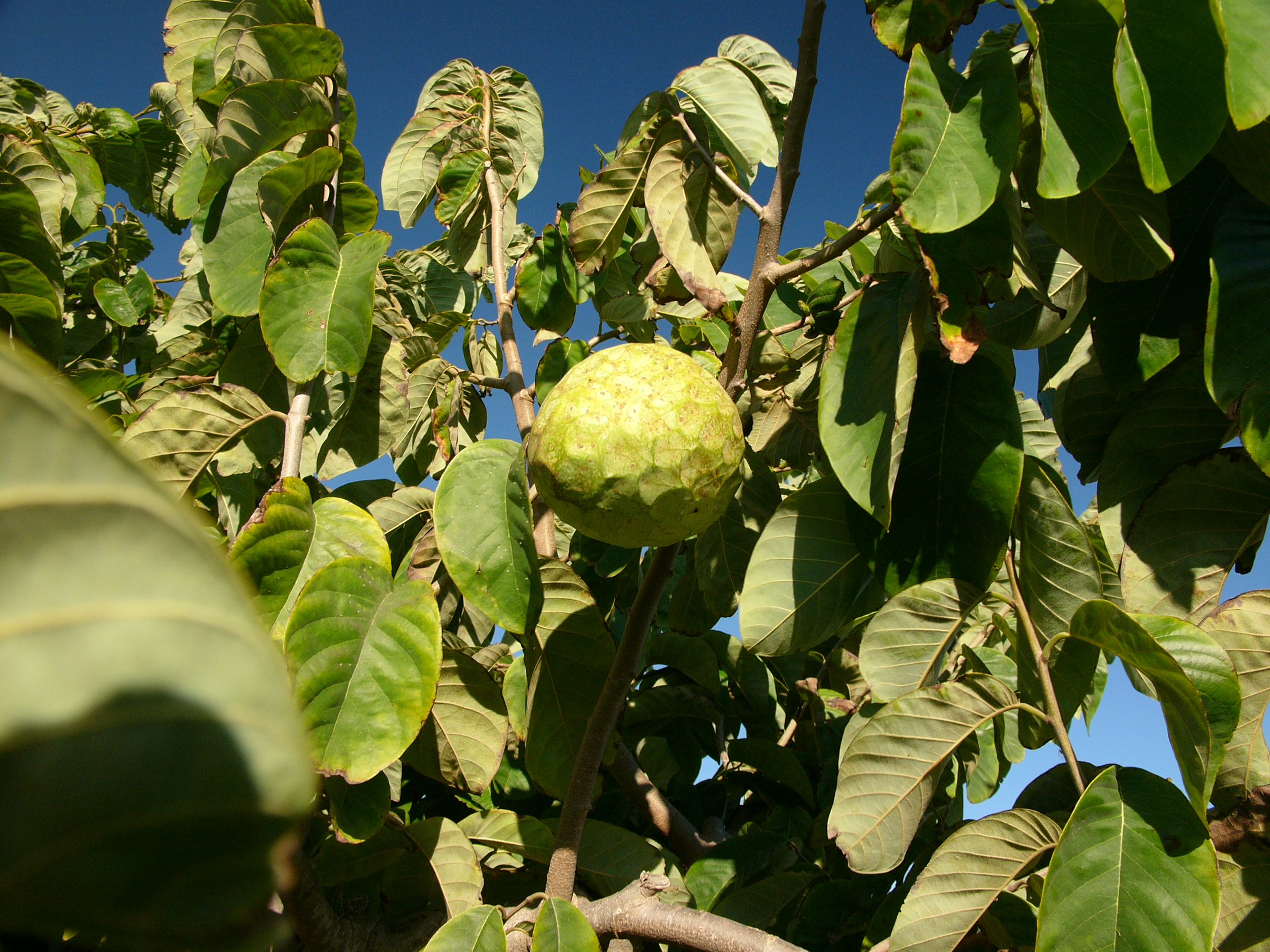
- Branch with leaves and fruit

Conservation status
- Least Concern (IUCN 3.1)

Scientific classification
- Kingdom: Plantae
- Clade: Embryophytes
- Clade: Tracheophytes
- Clade: Angiosperms
- Clade: Magnoliids
- Order: Magnoliales
- Family: Annonaceae
- Genus: Annona
- Species: A. cherimola

Binomial name
- Annona cherimola Mill.
- Current range of native and naturalized A. cherimola

Synonyms
- Annona pubescens Salisb. Annona tripetala Aiton; Annona cherimolia Mill. orth. var.

= Cherimoya =

Edible fruit-bearing species of plant

The cherimoya (Annona cherimola) is a species of fruit-bearing plant in the genus Annona, within the family Annonaceae, which also includes the closely related sweetsop and soursop.

Native to mountainous regions of Honduras and Guatemala, the plant has a long history of cultivation in the Andes and Central America, and is now grown in tropical and subtropical regions around the world. The edible fruit is generally well regarded.

== Description ==
Annona cherimola is a fairly dense, fast-growing, woody, briefly deciduous but mostly evergreen, low-branched, spreading tree or shrub. It is 5 to 9 metres (16 to 30 feet) tall.

Mature branches are sappy and woody. Young branches and twigs have a matting of short, fine, rust-colored hairs. The leathery leaves are 5–25 centimetres (2–10 in) long 3–10 cm (1 1/4–4 in) wide, and mostly elliptic, pointed at the ends and rounded near the leaf stalk. When young, they are covered with soft, fine, tangled, rust-colored hairs. When mature, the leaves bear hairs only along the veins on the undersurface. The tops are hairless and a dull medium green with paler veins, the backs are velvety, dull grey-green with raised pale green veins. New leaves are whitish below.

The leaves are single and alternate, dark green, and slightly hairy on the top surface. They attach to branches with stout 6–10 millimetres (1/4–3/8 inch) long and densely hairy leaf stalks.

Cherimoya trees bear very pale green, fleshy flowers. They are 3 cm (1 1/4 in) long with a very strong, fruity odor. Each flower has three outer, greenish, fleshy, oblong, downy petals and three smaller, pinkish inner petals with yellow or brown, finely matted hairs outside, whitish with purple spots and many stamens on the inside. Flowers appear on the branches opposite to the leaves, solitary or in pairs or groups of three, on flower stalks that are covered densely with fine rust-colored hairs, 8–12 mm (3/8–1/2 in) long. The buds are 15–18 mm (5/8–3/4 in) long and 5–8 mm (1/4–3/8 in) wide at the base. The pollen is shed as permanent tetrads.

=== Fruits ===
The edible cherimoya fruit is a large, green, conical or heart-shaped compound fruit, 10–20 cm (4–8 in) long, with diameters of 5–10 cm (2–4 in), and skin that gives the appearance of having overlapping scales or knobby warts. They ripen to brown with a fissured surface in late winter and early spring; they weigh on the average 150–500 grams (5.3–17.6 ounces), but extra-large specimens may weigh 2.7 kilograms (6 pounds) or more.

Cherimoya fruits are commercially classified according to degree of surface irregularity, as follows: 'Lisa', almost smooth, difficult to discern areoles; 'Impresa', with "fingerprint" depressions; 'Umbonata', with rounded protrusions at the apex of each areole; 'Mamilata' with fleshy, nipple-like protrusions; or 'Tuberculata', with conical protrusions having wart-like tips.

The flesh of the cherimoya contains numerous hard, inedible, black, bean-like, glossy seeds, 1–2 cm (1/2–3/4 in) long and about half as wide. Cherimoya seeds are poisonous if crushed open. Like other members of the family Annonaceae, the entire plant contains small amounts of neurotoxic acetogenins, such as annonacin, which appear to be linked to atypical parkinsonism in Guadeloupe. Moreover, an extract of the bark can induce paralysis if injected.

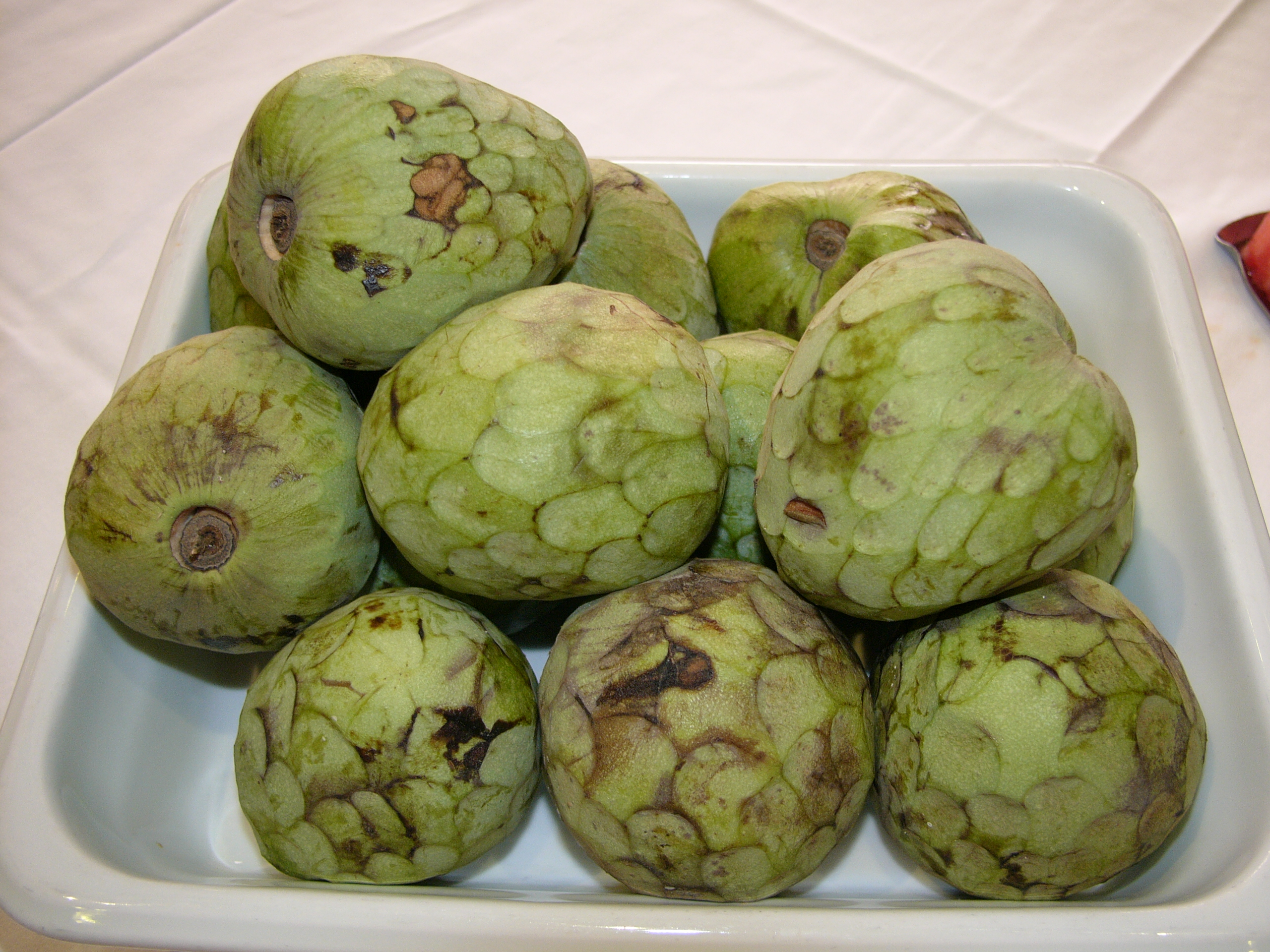
Ripe cherimoya fruits

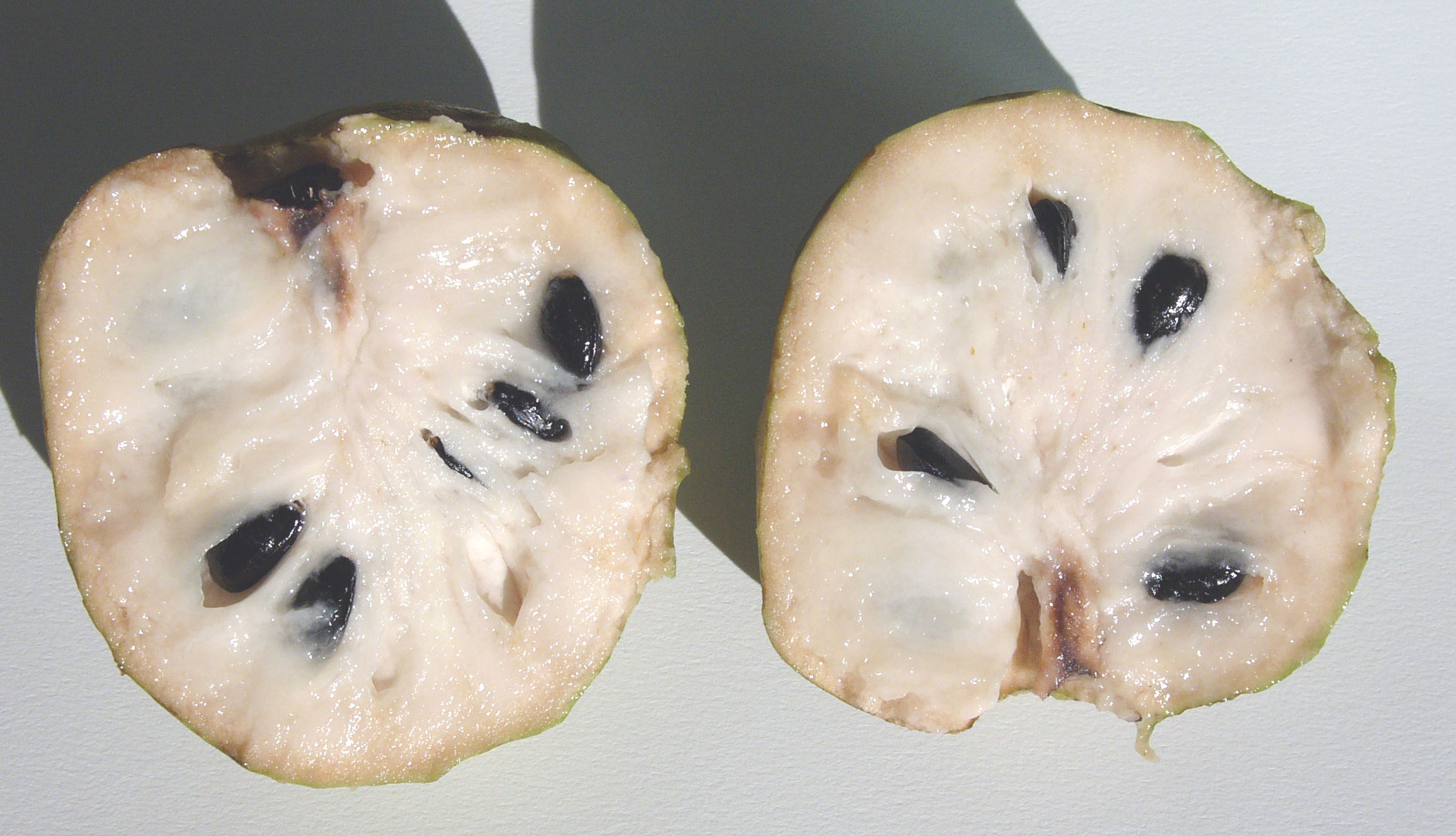
Split cherimoya fruit

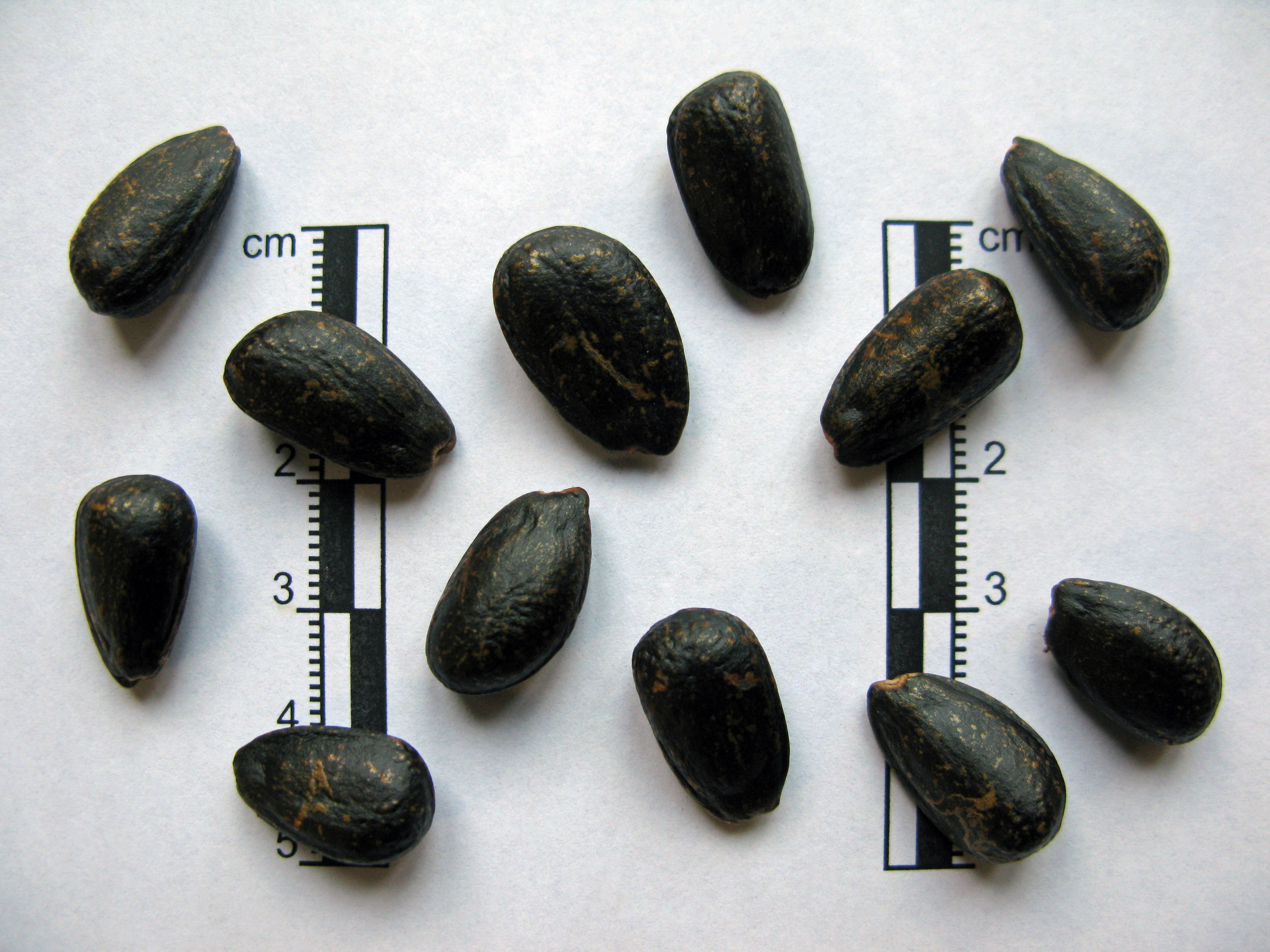
Cherimoya seeds

== Etymology ==
The name is derived from the Quechua word chirimuya, which means "cold seeds". The plant grows at high altitudes, where the weather is colder, and the seeds will germinate at higher altitudes. In Bolivia, Chile, Colombia, Ecuador, Peru, and Venezuela, the fruit is commonly known as chirimoya (spelled according to the rules of the Spanish language). It is also spelled cherimoyer.

It is also called the custard apple due to the creamy texture of the fruit's flesh.

== Distribution and habitat ==
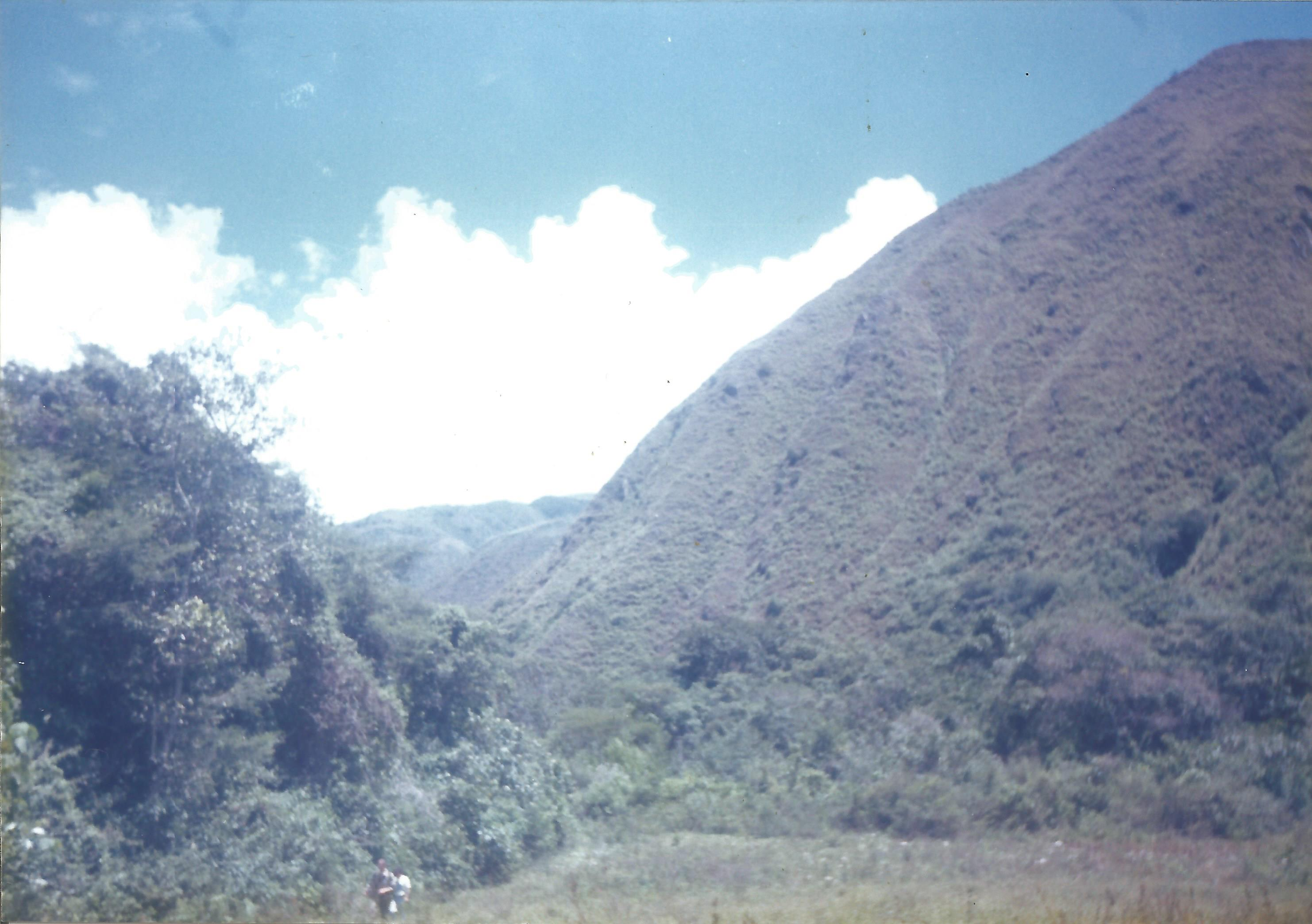
Region of wild cherimoyas in Vilcabamba, Ecuador

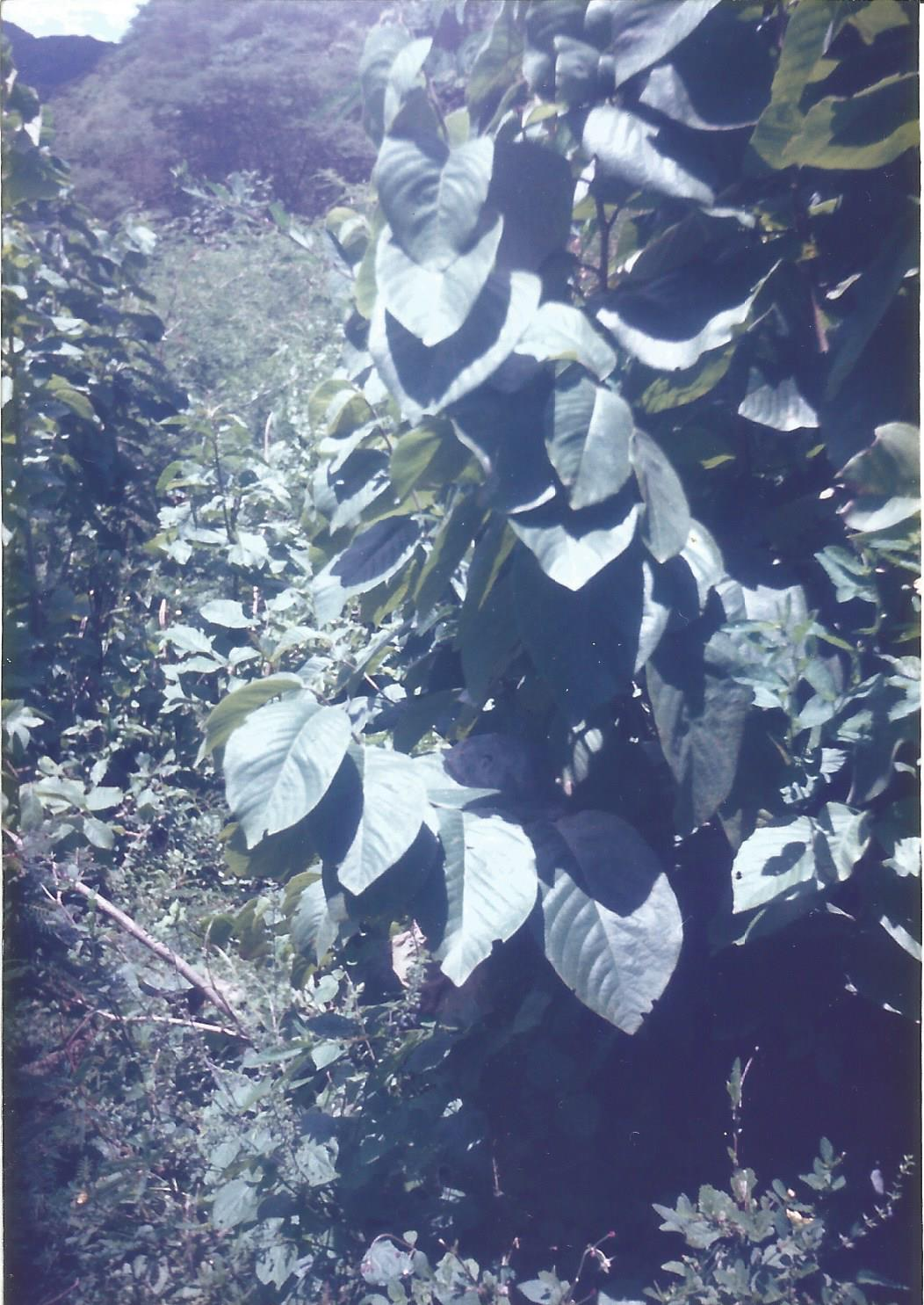
A wild cherimoya plant in Vilcabamba

Widely cultivated nowadays across tropical and subtropical regions of the world, A. cherimola originated in upland regions of the Americas. Once believed to be native to the Andes of Ecuador and Peru, genetic research places its origin in Honduras and Guatemala. Here, the genetic diversity was found to be the greatest. From its mesoamerican homeland humans brought the plant to South America about 4,000 years ago. Beginning in the 18th century, the cherimoya was distributed across the globe by Europeans.

== Ecology ==
=== Pollination ===
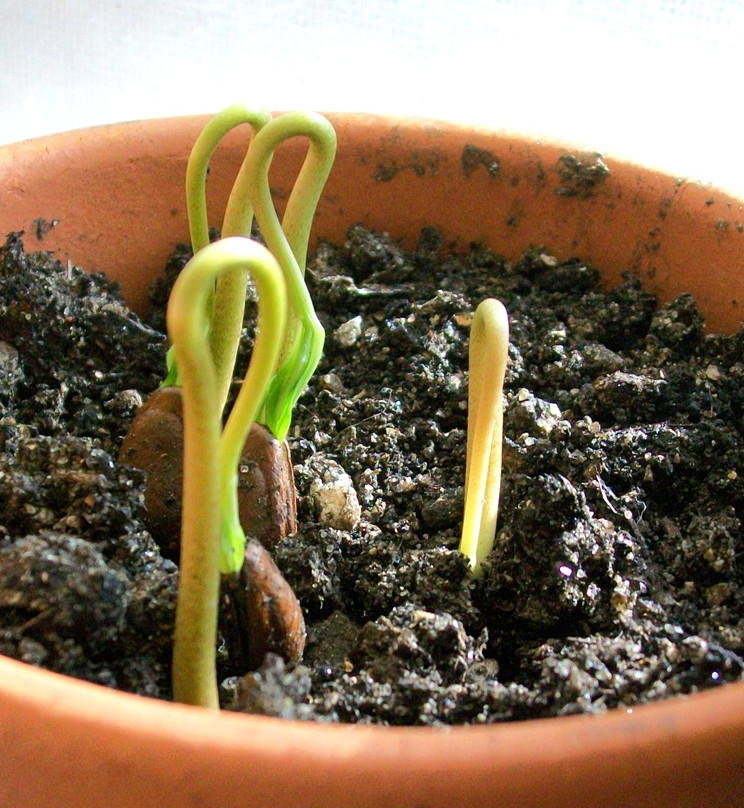
Cherimoya sprouts emerging

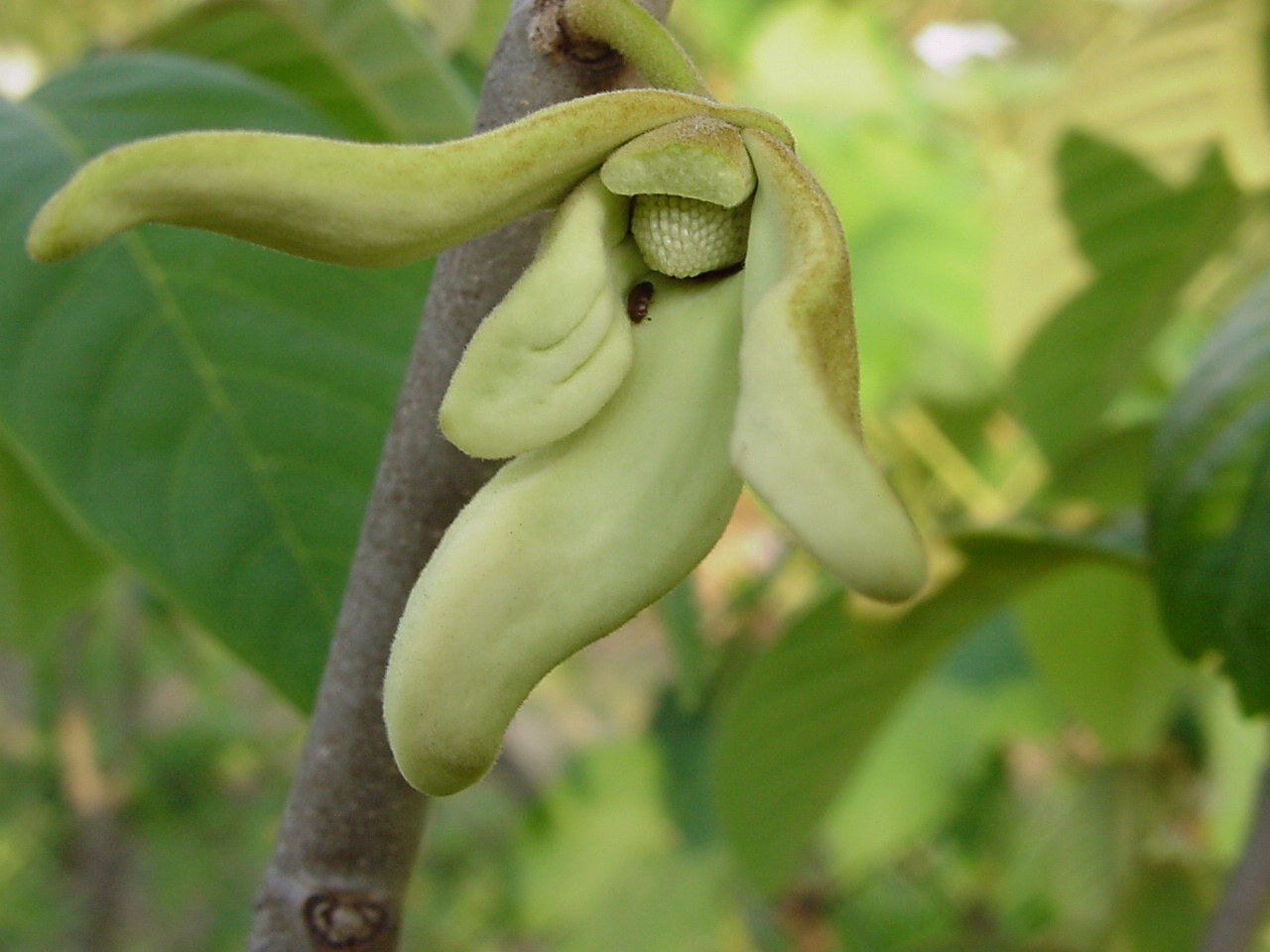
Nitidulidae beetle on cherimoya flower, Jundiaí, Brazil

The flowers of A. cherimola are hermaphroditic and have a mechanism to avoid self-pollination. The short-lived flowers open as female, then progress to a later, male stage in a matter of hours. This requires a type of pollinator that not only collects the pollen from flowers in the male stage but also deposits it in flowers during the female stage. Because cherimoya's genus, Annona, includes subtropical species greatly valued for human food and ecosystem services, its pollinators have been well studied. A 2017 publication points to small nitidulid sap beetles as the key pollinators:

Beetles arrived at the flowers with their bodies covered in pollen and these pollen grains were transferred to the stigmata while foraging on nutritious tissues at the base of the petals. With dehiscence of the stamens and retention within the floral chamber, the bodies of the floral visitors were again covered with pollen which they carried to newly opened flowers, thus promoting the cycle of pollination.

Because the beetle pollinators are not strong fliers, their entire lifecycle must be facilitated onsite in both orchard and forest restoration settings. The flower itself offers the ideal copulation chamber after beetles enter during the female (earliest) stage. At the inner base of the petals are nutritious tissues called "power bodies" on which the beetles feed until the male stage peaks. Exiting the flower at that time, pollen attaches to the bodies of the beetles, which they carry to yet another flower in its female stage. There, another round of feeding and possible copulation ensues.

Abundant leaves, rotting fruit, and other organic material on the ground beneath or near the flowering Annona species are crucial for the larval stage of the beetle. There eggs are laid, the larvae hatch and feed on decaying matter, then digging downward into the soil layer to pupate. Beetles emerge when flowering begins the following year.

In orchards distant from wild habitat, pollination by hand may be necessary. Growers use a small paint brush to collect the pollen from the male stage of flowers and then to also transfer pollen to the female stage. Another method is to encourage the sap beetles to engage in full life cycles, primarily by allowing leaf litter to accumulate and some fallen fruits to remain beneath the trees.

=== Climate requirements ===
In the tropics the cherimoya grows at altitudes of 700 to 2,400 m (2,300 to 7,900 ft), requiring warm-temperate conditions throughout the year, only tolerating occasional light frosts. In Guatemala the tree thrives at elevations of 1,200 to 1,800 m (3,900 to 5,900 ft) with 1,300 mm (51 in) of rainfall with a pronounced dry season.

The evaluation of 20 locations in Loja Province, Ecuador, indicated certain growing preferences of wild cherimoya, including altitude between 1,500 and 2,000 m (4,900 and 6,600 ft), optimum annual temperature range between 18 and 20 °C (64 and 68 °F), annual precipitation between 800 and 1,000 mm (31 and 39 in), and soils with high sand content and slightly acidic properties with pH between 5.0 and 6.5.

== Cultivation ==
The plant has a long history of cultivation in the Andes and Central America. Today it is grown in tropical and subtropical regions throughout the world, including Central America, northern South America, southern California, South Asia, Australia, the Mediterranean region, and North Africa.

In Chile, it has traditionally been cultivated in the valleys and oases of the north, as far south as the valley of Aconcagua.

In the Mediterranean region, it is cultivated mainly in southern Spain and Madeira, where it enjoys protected designation of origin status, where it was introduced between 1751 and 1797, after which it was carried to Italy, but now can also be found in several countries of Africa, the Middle East, and Oceania. It is cultivated throughout the Americas, including Hawaii since 1790 and California, where it was introduced in 1871.

In Western horticulture, growers are often advised to grow cherimoya in full sun, while the plant has been considered shade-tolerant in Japan. In 2001, a study conducted by Kyoto University showed that shading of 50–70% sunlight was adequate to obtain an optimal light environment.

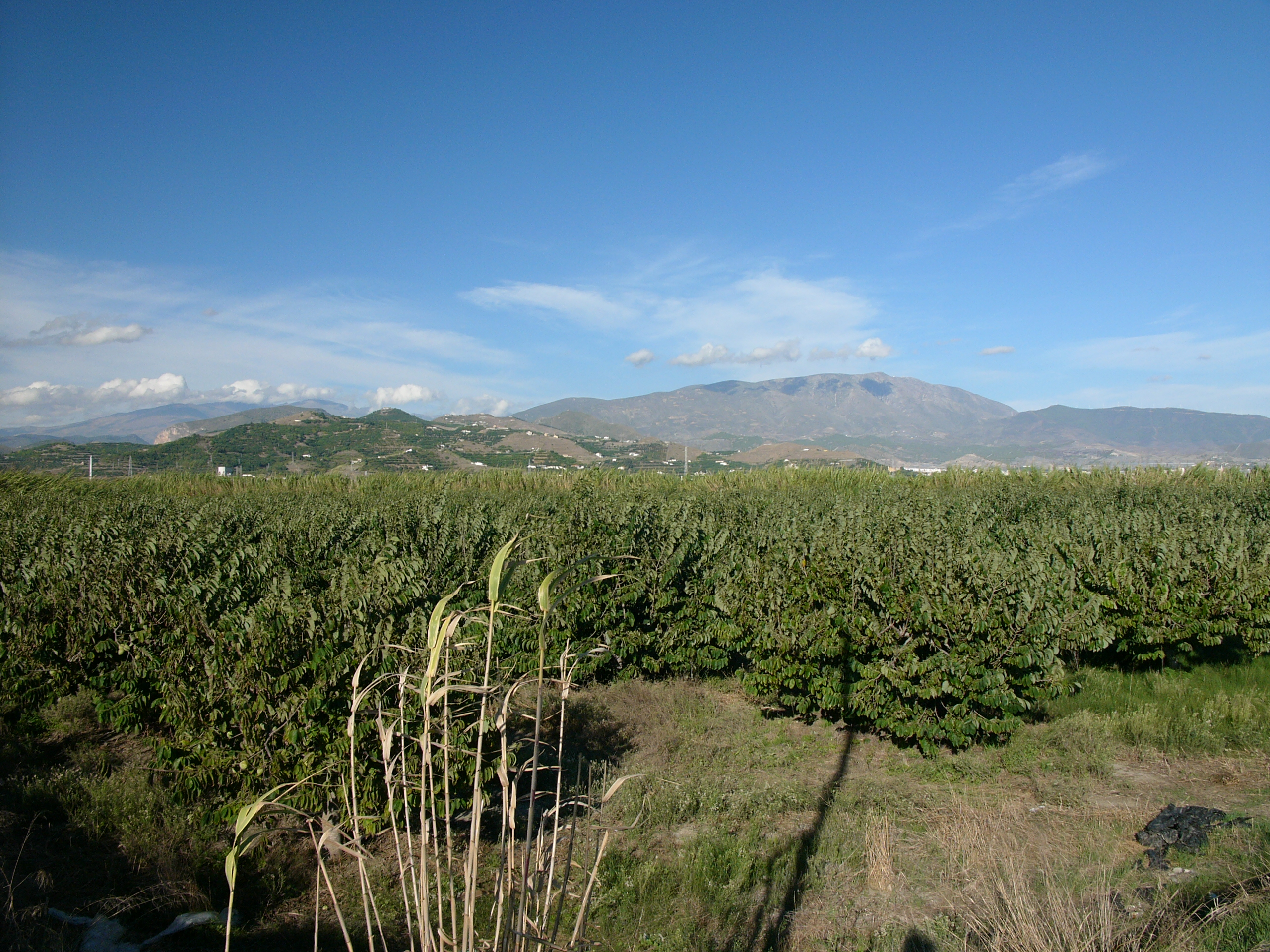
Plantation in southern Andalucia

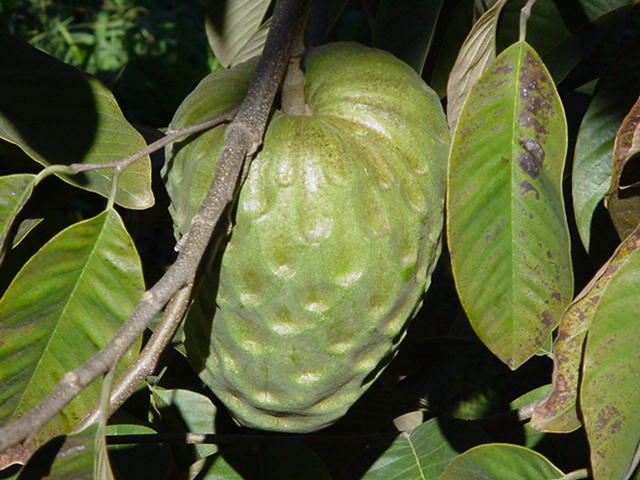
Cherimoya fruit cultivated in Pedra Bela, São Paulo, Brazil

=== Cultivars ===
The cherimoya of the Granada-Málaga tropical coast in Spain is a fruit of the cultivar 'Fino de Jete' with the EU's protected designation of origin appellation. 'Fino de Jete' fruits have skin type Impressa and are smooth or slightly concave at the edges. The fruit is round, oval, heart-shaped, or kidney-shaped. The seeds are enclosed in the carpels and so do not detach easily. The flavor balances intense sweetness with slight acidity and the soluble sugar content exceeds 17° Bx. According to the Official Journal of the European Union, the variety is prepared and packed in the geographical area because:

it is a very delicate, perishable fruit and its skin is very susceptible to browning caused by mechanical damage, such as rubbing, knocks, etc. The fruit must be handled with extreme care, from picking by hand in the field to packing in the warehouse, which must be carried out within 24 hours. Repacking or further handling is strictly forbidden.

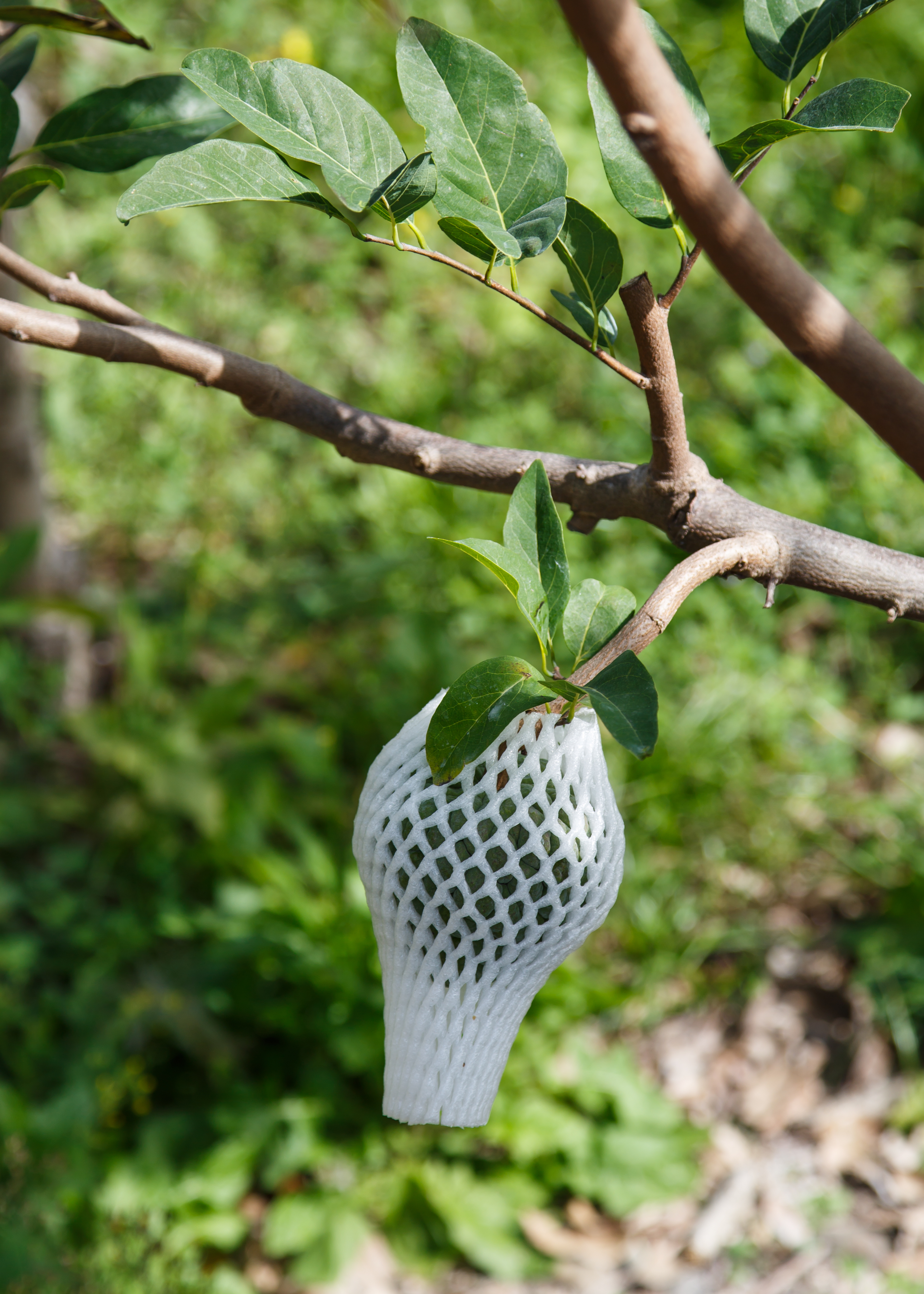
A cherimoya fruit, growing in a protective cover on a plantation in Bin Lang Village, Taiwan

Annona cherimola, preferring the cool Andean altitudes, readily hybridizes with other Annona species. A hybrid with A. squamosa called atemoya has received some attention in West Africa, Australia, Brazil, and Florida.

=== Harvest ===
Large fruits which are uniformly green, without cracks or mostly browned skin, are best. The optimum temperature for storage is 8–12 °C (46–54 °F), depending on cultivar, ripeness stage, and duration, with an optimum relative humidity of 90–95%. Unripe cherimoyas will ripen at room temperature, when they will yield to gentle pressure. Exposure to ethylene (100 ppm for one to two days) accelerates ripening of mature green cherimoya and other Annona fruits; they can ripen in about five days if kept at 15 to 20 °C (59 to 68 °F). Ethylene removal can also be helpful in slowing the ripening of mature green fruits.

== Nutrition and edibility ==
Raw cherimoya fruit is 79% water, 18% carbohydrate, 2% protein, and 1% fat. In a 100 g (3.5 oz) reference amount providing 75 calories, cherimoya is a moderate source (10–15% of the Daily Value) of vitamin C, vitamin B_{6}, riboflavin, and potassium, with no other micronutrients in significant content.

Cherimoya, raw
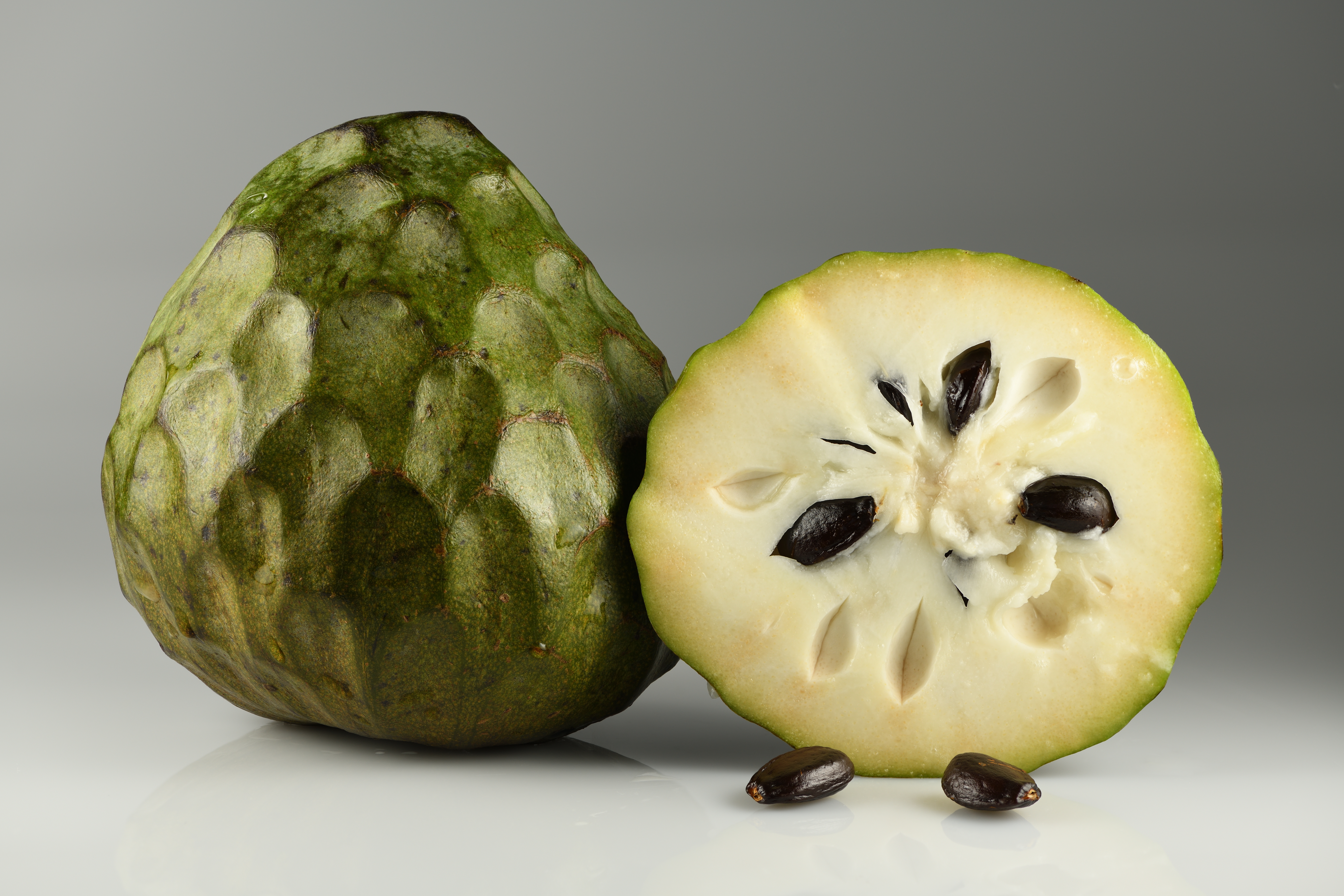

Nutritional value per 100 g (3.5 oz)
- Energy: 313 kJ (75 kcal)
- Carbohydrates: 17.71 g
- Sugars: 12.87
- Dietary fiber: 3 g
- Fat: 0.68 g
- Protein: 1.57 g
Vitamins and minerals
Vitamins	Quantity %DV^{†}
Thiamine (B1)	8% 0.101 mg
Riboflavin (B2)	10% 0.131 mg
Niacin (B3)	4% 0.644 mg
Pantothenic acid (B5)	7% 0.345 mg
Vitamin B6	15% 0.257 mg
Folate (B9)	6% 23 μg
Vitamin C	14% 12.6 mg
Vitamin E	2% 0.27 mg
Minerals	Quantity %DV^{†}
Calcium	1% 10 mg
Iron	2% 0.27 mg
Magnesium	4% 17 mg
Manganese	4% 0.093 mg
Phosphorus	2% 26 mg
Potassium	10% 287 mg
Sodium	0% 7 mg
Zinc	1% 0.16 mg
- Other constituents: Quantity
- Water: 79.4 g
- Link to USDA Database entry
- ^{†}Percentages estimated using US recommendations for adults, except for potassium, which is estimated based on expert recommendation from the National Academies.

According to botanist Berthold Carl Seemann,

The pineapple, the mangosteen, and the cherimoya are considered the finest fruits in the world, and I have tasted them in those localities where they are supposed to attain their highest perfection – the pineapple in Guayaquil, the mangosteen in the Indian Archipelago, and the cherimoya on the slopes of the Andes, and if I were asked which would be the best fruit, I would choose without hesitation, cherimoya. Its taste, indeed, surpasses that of every other fruit, and Haenke was quite right when he called it the masterpiece of Nature.

The fruits require storage at 50 °F (10 °C) to inhibit softening and maintain edibility. Different varieties have different flavors, textures, and shapes. The flavor of the flesh ranges from mellow sweet to tangy or acidic sweet, with variable suggestions of pineapple, banana, pear, papaya, strawberry or other berry, and apple, depending on the variety. The ripened flesh is creamy white. When ripe, the skin is green and gives slightly to pressure. Some characterize the fruit flavor as a blend of banana, pineapple, papaya, peach, and strawberry. The fruit can be chilled and eaten with a spoon, which has earned it another nickname, the "ice cream fruit". In Chile and Peru, it is commonly used in ice creams and yogurt.

When the fruit is ripe and still has the fresh, fully mature green-yellow skin color, the texture is like that of a soft ripe pear or papaya. When the skin turns brown at room temperature, the fruit is no longer good for human consumption.

== Brand ==
Chirimoya Cumbe is a well-known case involving collective marks in trademark law. The World Intellectual Property Organization has defined these collective marks as "signs which distinguish the geographical origin, material, mode of manufacturing or other common characteristics of goods or services of different enterprises using the collective mark." The owner of a collective mark are members of an association of such enterprises.

Cumbe is a valley in the Huarochiri province of Peru where the climatic conditions are favourable for growing chirimoya. The fruit produced in the Cumbe valley is considered of superior quality, with a large fruit size, soft skin, low seed index (number of seeds per 100 grams of fruit), and high nutrient value.

In 1997, Matildo Pérez, a peasant from a village community in the heights of Lima, decided to apply personally to the National Institute for the Defense of Competition and Intellectual Property of Peru (INDECOPI) for the registration of the trademark "Chirimoya Cumbe". The application was refused since no exclusive rights in generic names can be granted to a single person. Mr. Pérez appeared at INDECOPI again, this time with a delegation headed by the Deputy Mayor of Cumbe, to register the "Chirimoya Cumbe" as a trademark which would give the community in Lima exclusive rights with respect to the name "Cumbe".

The INDECOPI officials explained that "Chirimoya Cumbe" is in fact an appellation of origin, not a trademark. To be more precise, the word "Cumbe" is an appellation of Peruvian origin, because the valley of Cumbe is a geographical area that gives certain distinctive properties to the Chirimoya grown there.

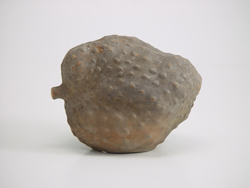
Moche ceramic cherimoya, 200 BC, Larco Museum collection in Lima

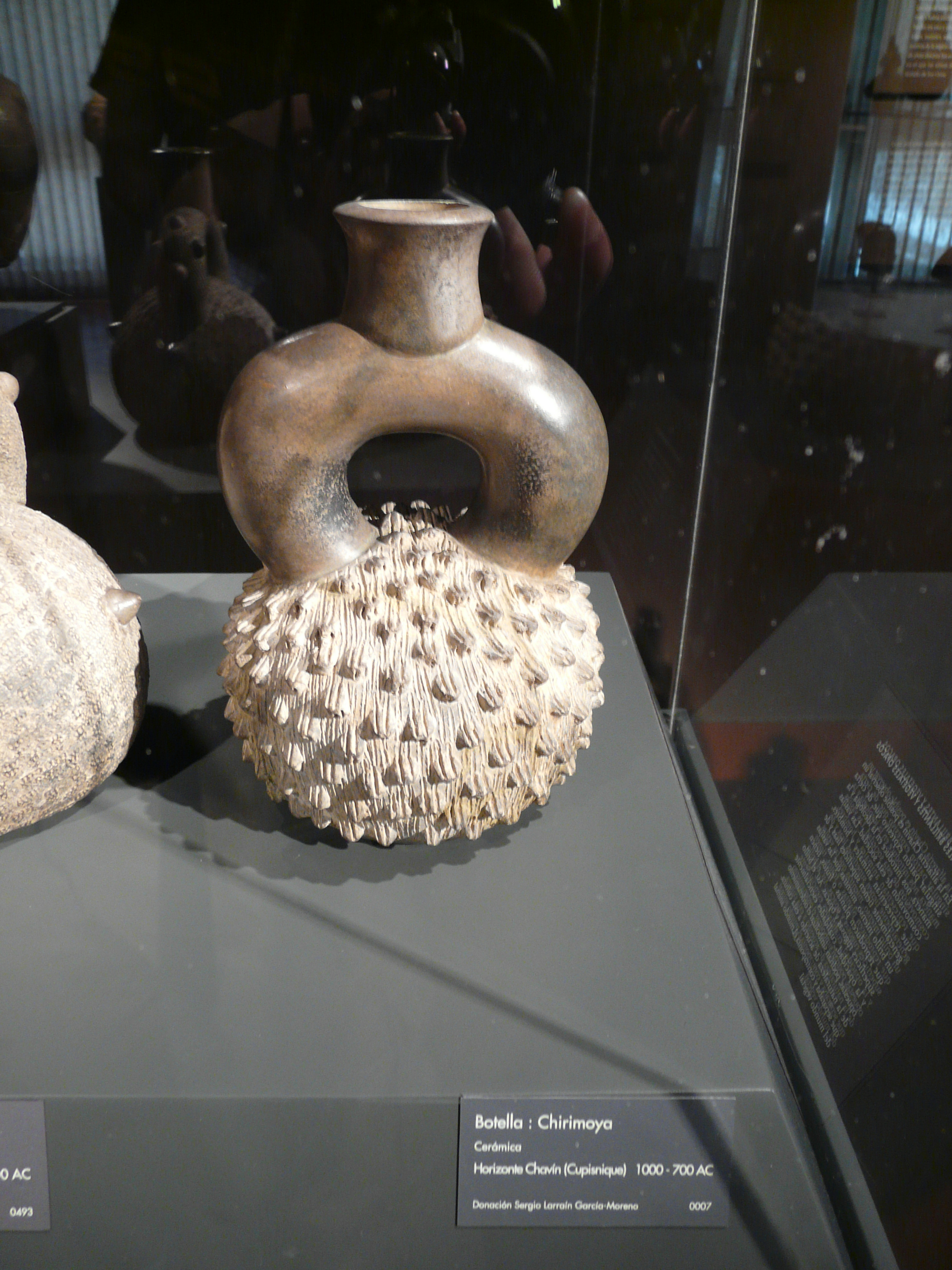
Cherimoya-shaped bottle made by the Cupisnique culture c. 1000 to 700 BC, Chala region, Peru

The people of Cumbe declined the proposition of appellation of origin: "It is said that with appellations of origin the State is the owner, and it is the State that authorizes use, and that is why we are saying no. We do not want the State to be the owner of the 'Cumbe' name."

After lengthy search for solutions, it was suggested that "Chirimoya Cumbe" should be registered as a "collective mark", the owners of which would be the people of Cumbe and which would be used according to rules that they themselves would lay down.

In 2022, the name "Chirimoya Cumbe" has its own characteristic logo and is registered as a collective mark in the name of the village of Santo Toribio de Cumbe (in Class 31 of the International Classification).

== In culture ==
The Moche culture of Peru had a fascination with agriculture and represented fruits and vegetables in their art; cherimoyas were often depicted in their ceramics.

The American author Mark Twain called the cherimoya "the most delicious fruit known to men".

== See also ==
- Atemoya (a cross of A. squamosa and A. cherimola)
- List of cherimoya cultivars
- Pawpaw (Asimina spp.)
- White sapote (Casimiroa edulis) – sometimes mislabeled as cherimoya
- Wild soursop (Annona senegalensis)
- Wild sweetsop (Annona reticulata)
