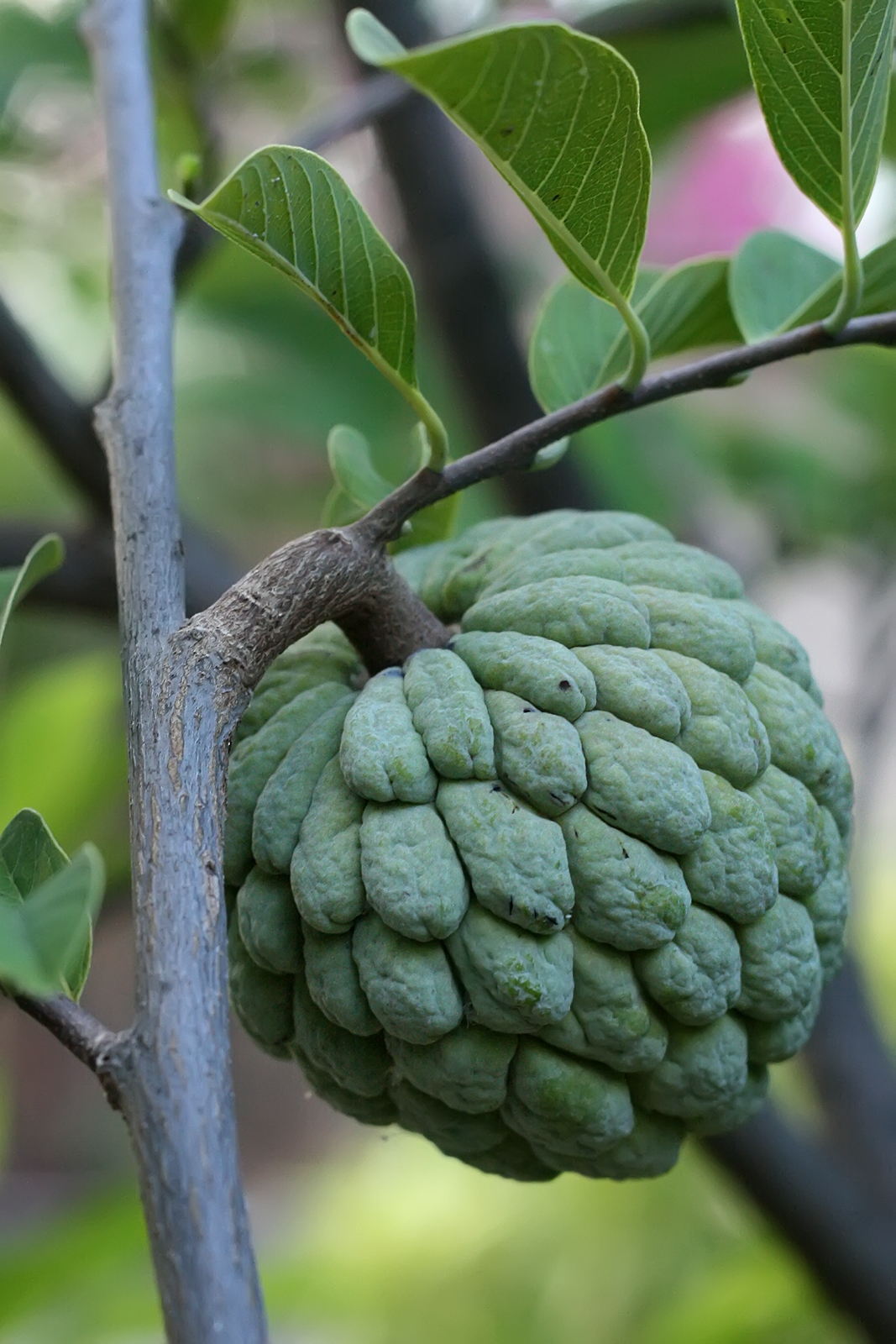

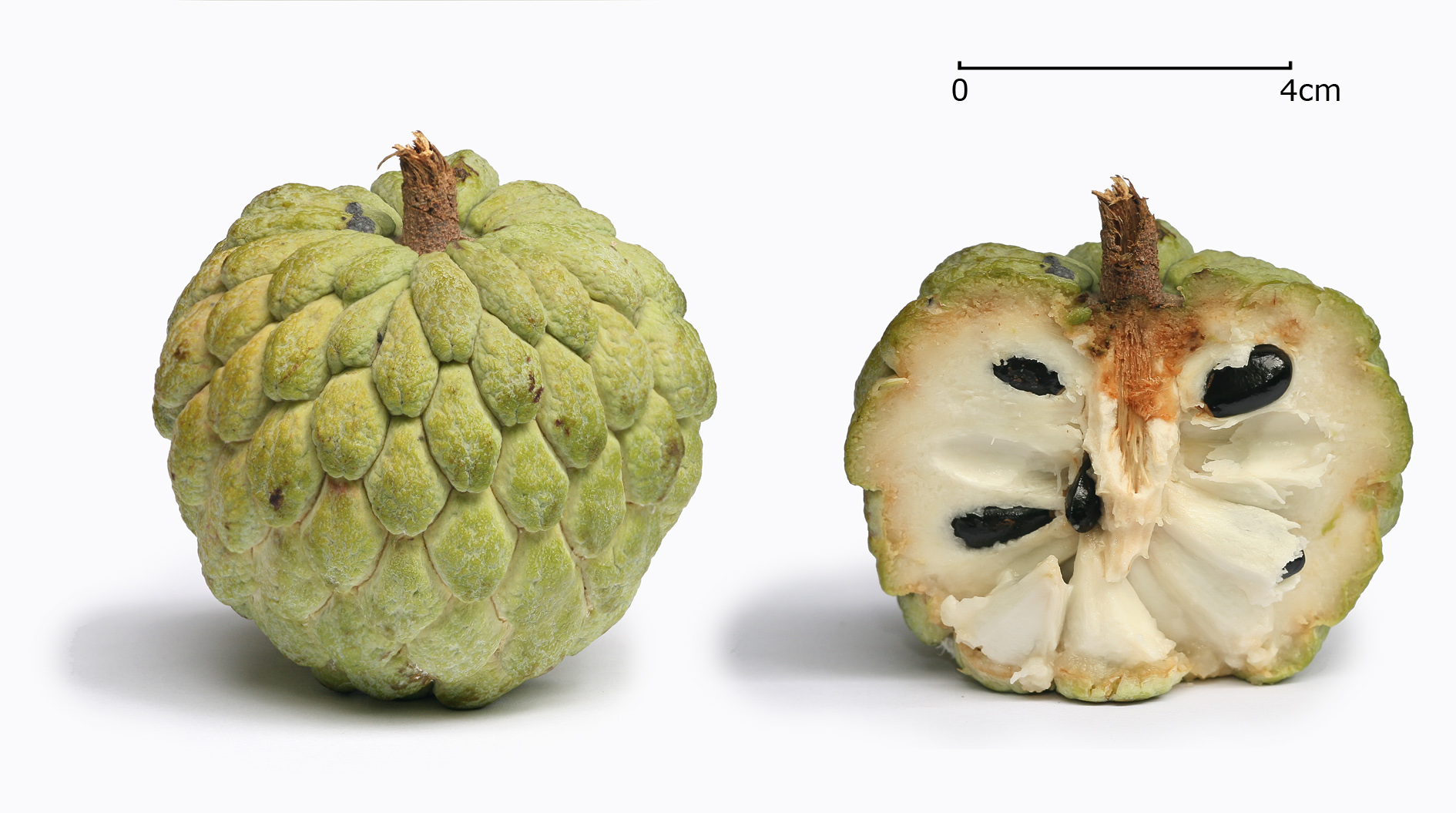
- Cross section of the fruit shown on right

Conservation status
- Least Concern (IUCN 3.1)

Scientific classification
- Kingdom: Plantae
- Clade: Tracheophytes
- Clade: Angiosperms
- Clade: Magnoliids
- Order: Magnoliales
- Family: Annonaceae
- Genus: Annona
- Species: A. squamosa

Binomial name
- Annona squamosa L.

Synonyms
- Annona asiatica L.; Annona asiatica Vahl; Annona cinerea Dunal; Annona distincta Raeusch.; Annona forskahlii DC.; Annona glabra Forssk.; Annona squamosa Delile; Annona squamosa f. parvifolia Kuntze; Xylopia glabra L.; Xylopicron glabrum (L.) Crantz

= Annona squamosa =

Species of tree

Annona squamosa is a small, well-branched tree or shrub from the family Annonaceae that bears edible fruits called sugar apples, sweetsops or custard apples. It tolerates a tropical lowland climate better than its relatives Annona reticulata and Annona cherimola, and is the most widely cultivated of these Annona species.

Annona squamosa is semi-(or late) deciduous, and 3 to 8 metres (10 to 26 feet) tall, similar to soursop (Annona muricata). It is a native of tropical climate in the Americas, and Spanish traders aboard the Manila galleons docking in the Philippines brought it to Asia.

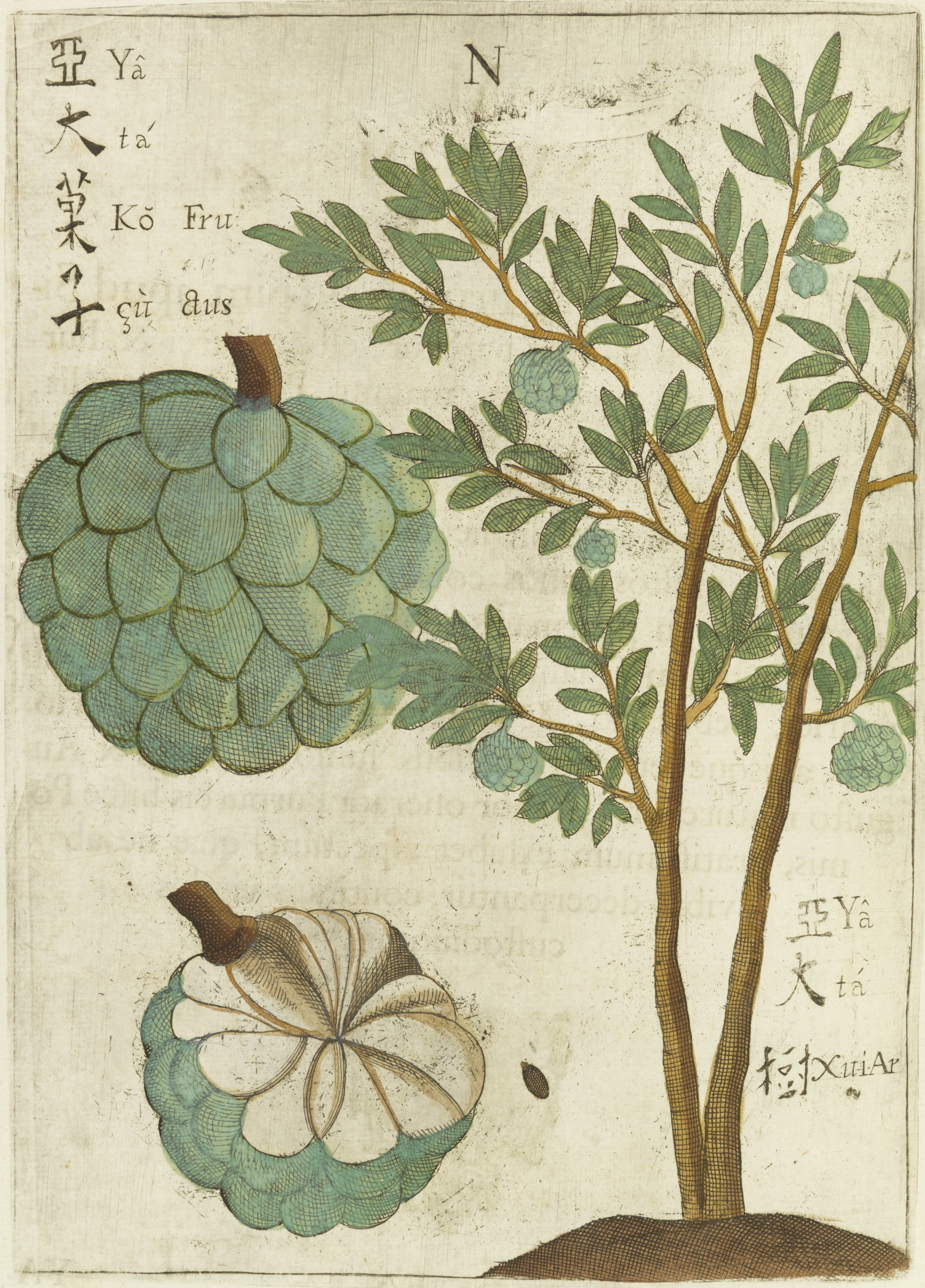
Michał Boym's drawing of, probably, the sugar-apple, in his Flora Sinensis (1655)

The atemoya or "pineapple sugar-apple", a hybrid between the sugar-apple and the cherimoya, is common in Taiwan, although it was first developed in the United States in 1908. The fruit is similar in sweetness to the sugar-apple; as its name suggests, it tastes like pineapple.

== Description ==
=== Fruits ===
Fruits ripen 3 to 4 months after flowering. Aggregate and soft fruits form from the numerous and loosely united pistils of a flower which become enlarged and mature into fruits which are distinct from fruits of other species of the Annona genus.

The round or heart-shaped, greenish yellow, ripened aggregate fruit is pendulous on a thickened stalk; 5 to 10 cm (2 to 3 7/8 in) in diameter with many round protuberances and covered with a powdery bloom. Fruits are formed of loosely cohering or almost free carpels (the ripened pistels).

The pulp is white tinged yellow, edible and sweetly aromatic. Each carpel containing an oblong, shiny and smooth, dark brown to black, 1.3 to 1.6 cm (1/2 to 5/8 in) long seed. The fruit is spherical-conical, 5–10 centimetres (2–4 inches) in diameter and 6–10 cm (2 1/4–4 in) long, and weighing 100–240 grams (3.5–8.5 ounces), with a thick rind composed of knobby segments. The colour is typically pale green through blue-green, with a deep pink blush in certain varieties, and typically has a bloom. It is unique among Annona fruits in being segmented; the segments tend to separate when ripe, exposing the interior pulp.

The flesh is fragrant and sweet, creamy white through light yellow, and resembles and tastes like custard. The seeds are coated with the flesh, It is found adhering to 13-to-16-millimetre-long (1/2 to 5/8 in) seeds forming individual segments arranged in a single layer around a conical core. It is soft, slightly grainy, and slippery. The hard, shiny seeds may number 20–40 or more per fruit and have a brown to black coat, although varieties exist that are almost seedless. The seeds can be ground for use as an insecticide, although this has not been approved by the United States Environmental Protection Agency or EU authorities. The skin is shaped like a Reuleaux triangle coloured green and rough in texture. Due to the soft flesh and structure of the sugar apple, it is fragile to pressure when ripe.

The fruit has sweet whitish pulp, and is sold in tropical markets. It is rarely cooked.

=== Flowers ===
Solitary or in short lateral clusters of 2–4 about 2.5 cm (1 in) long, greenish-yellow flowers on a hairy, slender 2 cm (3/4 in) long stalk. Three green outer petals, purplish at the base, oblong, 1.6 to 2.5 cm (5/8 to 1 in) long, and 0.6 to 0.75 cm (1/4 to 5/16 in) wide, three inner petals reduced to minute scales or absent. Very numerous stamens; crowded, white, less than 1.6 cm (5/8 in) long; ovary light green. Styles white, crowded on the raised axis. Each pistil forms a separate tubercle (small rounded wartlike protuberance), mostly 1.3 to 1.9 cm (1/2 to 3/4 in) long and 0.6 to 1.3 cm (1/4 to 1/2 in) wide which matures into the aggregate fruit.

Flowering occurs in spring-early summer and flowers are pollinated by nitidulid beetles. Its pollen is shed as permanent tetrads.

=== Stems and leaves ===
Branches with light brown bark and visible leaf scars; inner bark light yellow and slightly bitter; twigs become brown with light brown dots (lenticels – small, oval, rounded spots upon the stem or branch of a plant, from which the underlying tissues may protrude or roots may issue).

Thin, simple, alternate leaves occur singly, 5 to 17 centimetres (2 to 6 3/4 inches) long and 2 to 6 cm (3/4 to 2 3/8 in) wide, and are rounded at the base and pointed at the tip (oblong-lanceolate). They are pale green on both surfaces and mostly hairless with slight hairs on the underside when young. The sides sometimes are slightly unequal and the leaf edges are without teeth, inconspicuously hairy when young.

The leaf stalks are 0.4 to 2.2 cm (1/8 to 7/8 in) long, green, and sparsely pubescent.

== Nutrition ==
Sugar-apple, (sweetsop), raw
Nutritional value per 100 g (3.5 oz)
- Energy: 393 kJ (94 kcal)
- Carbohydrates: 23.64 g
- Dietary fiber: 4.4 g
- Fat: 0.29 g
- Protein: 2.06 g
Vitamins and minerals
| Vitamins | Quantity %DV^{†} |
| Thiamine (B1) | 9% 0.11 mg |
| Riboflavin (B2) | 9% 0.113 mg |
| Niacin (B3) | 6% 0.883 mg |
| Pantothenic acid (B5) | 5% 0.226 mg |
| Vitamin B6 | 12% 0.2 mg |
| Folate (B9) | 4% 14 μg |
| Vitamin C | 40% 36.3 mg |
| Minerals | Quantity %DV^{†} |
| Calcium | 2% 24 mg |
| Iron | 3% 0.6 mg |
| Magnesium | 5% 21 mg |
| Manganese | 18% 0.42 mg |
| Phosphorus | 3% 32 mg |
| Potassium | 8% 247 mg |
| Sodium | 0% 9 mg |
| Zinc | 1% 0.1 mg |
- Other constituents: Quantity
- Water: 73 g
- Link to USDA Database entry
- ^{†}Percentages estimated using US recommendations for adults, except for potassium, which is estimated based on expert recommendation from the National Academies.

Sugar-apple is 73% water, 24% carbohydrates, 2% protein, and contains negligible fat (table). In a reference amount of 100 g (3.5 oz), sugar-apple supplies 94 calories and is a rich source (20% or more of the Daily Value) of vitamin C and a moderate source of manganese and vitamin B_{6}, with no other micronutrients in significant content (table).

=== Chemistry ===
The diterpenoid alkaloid atisine (from the fruit's Tagalog name atis) is the most abundant alkaloid in the root. Other constituents of Annona squamosa include the alkaloids oxophoebine, reticuline, isocorydine, and methylcorydaldine, and the flavonoid quercetin-3-O-glucoside.

Bayer AG has patented the extraction process and molecular identity of the annonaceous acetogenin annonin, as well as its use as a biopesticide, although this use has not been approved by US or EU authorities. Other acetogenins have been isolated from the seeds, and bark.

== Distribution and habitat ==
Annona squamosa is native to the tropical Americas, but the exact origin is unknown. It is the most widely cultivated of all the species of Annona, being grown for its fruit throughout the tropics and warmer subtropics such as in India, Indonesia, Thailand, Taiwan, and China as far north as Suzhou since its Old World introduction in the 16th century. It is naturalized as far north as Cuba, south Florida, Mexico, Central America, and as far south as Bahia, Brazil. It is an invasive species in some areas.

== Climate and cultivation ==
Like most species of Annona, it requires a tropical or subtropical climate with summer temperatures from 25 °C (77 °F) to 41 °C (106 °F), and mean winter temperatures above 15 °C (59 °F). It is sensitive to cold and frost, being defoliated below 10 °C (50 °F) and killed by temperatures of a couple of degrees below freezing. It is only moderately drought-tolerant, requiring at least 700 millimetres (28 in) of annual rainfall, and does not produce fruit well during droughts.

It will grow from sea level to an altitude of 2,000 metres (6,600 feet) and thrives in hot dry climates, differing in its tolerance of lowland tropics from many of the other fruit bearers in the Annona family.

It is a prolific bearer, and it produces fruit within as little as two to three years. A five-year-old tree can produce as many as 50 sugar apples. Poor fruit production has been reported in Florida because there are few natural pollinators (honeybees have a difficult time penetrating the tightly closed female flowers); however, hand pollination with a natural fibre brush is effective in increasing yield. Natural pollinators include beetles (Coleoptera) of the families Nitidulidae, Staphylinidae, Chrysomelidae, Curculionidae and Scarabaeidae.

== Ecology ==
It is a host plant for larvae of the butterfly Graphium agamemnon (tailed jay). In the Philippines, the fruit is commonly eaten by the Philippine fruit bat (kabag or kabog), which spreads the seeds from island to island.

== Uses ==
In traditional Indian, Thai, and Native American medicines, the leaves are boiled down with water, possibly mixed with other specific botanicals, and used in a decoction to treat dysentery and urinary tract infection. In Indian medicine, the leaves are also crushed for use as a poultice, and applied to wounds. Extracts are used in ethnomedicine. In Haiti, the fruit is known as cachiman and is used to simply make juice.

== Gallery ==
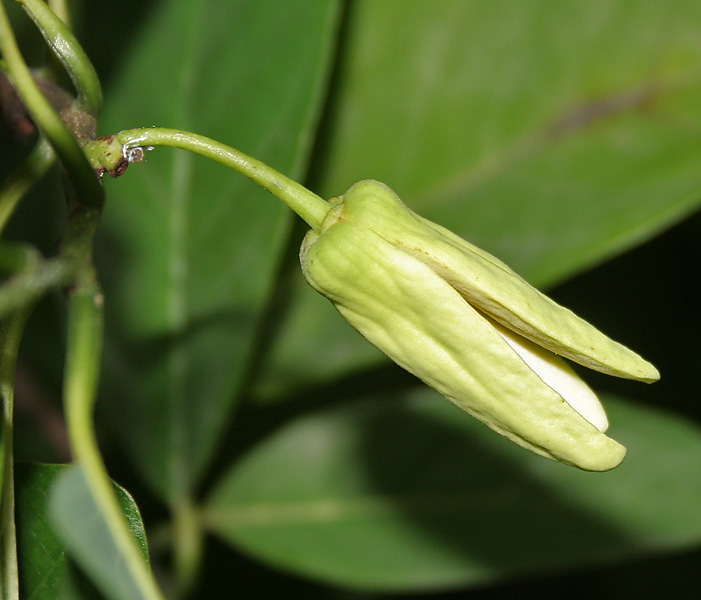
Flower

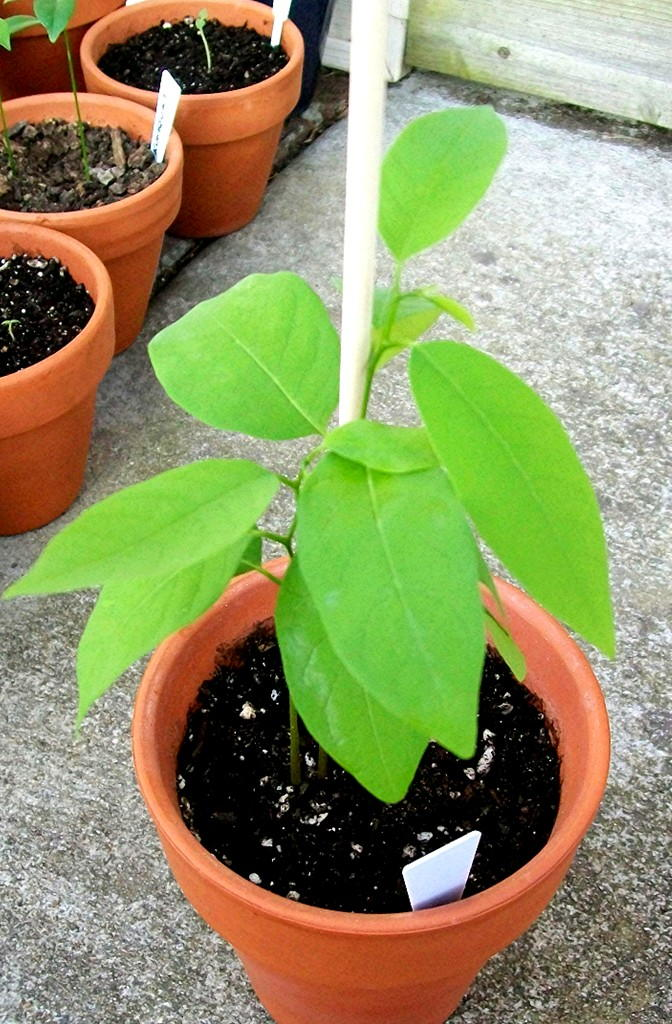
Seedling

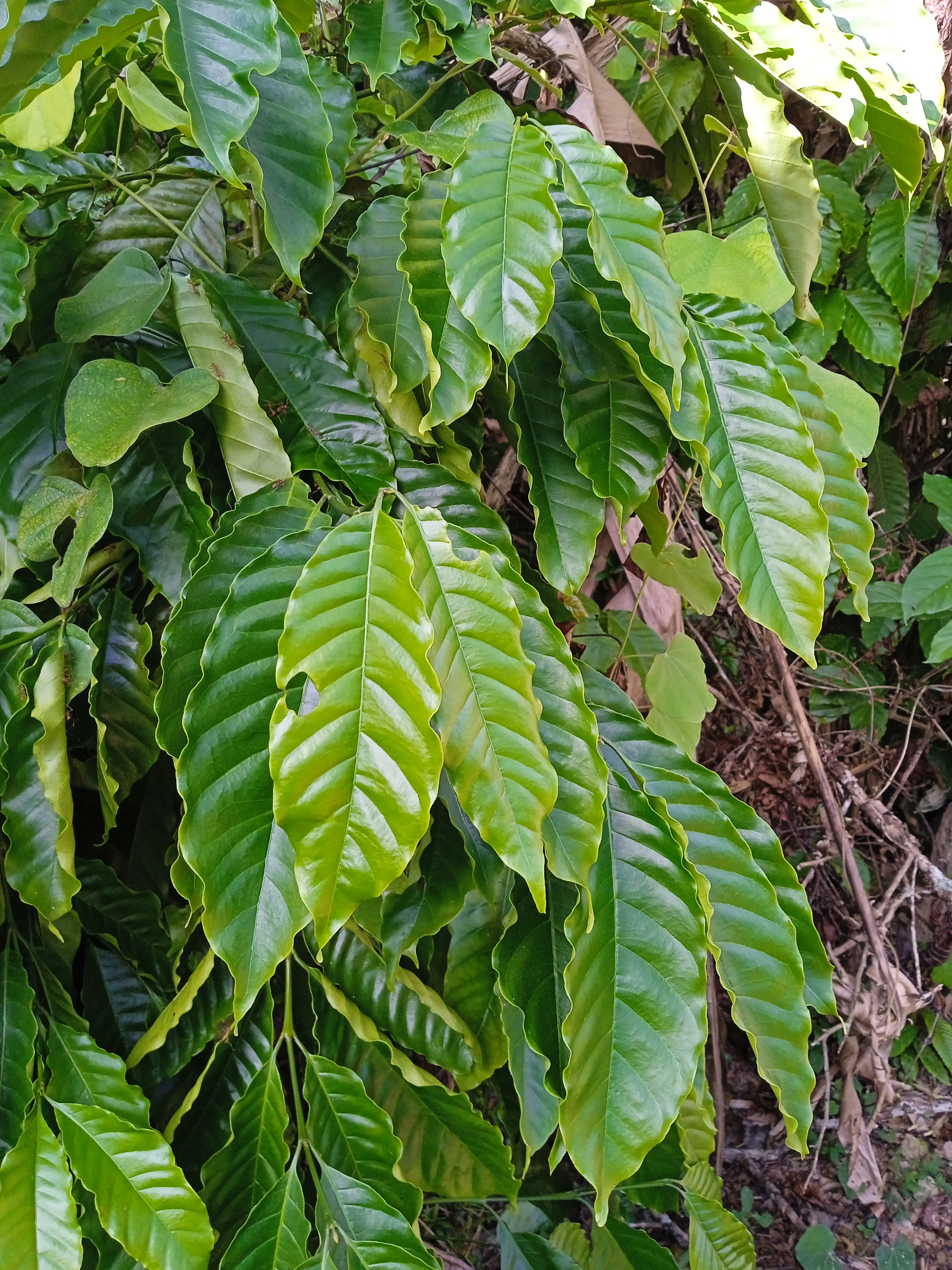
Leaves

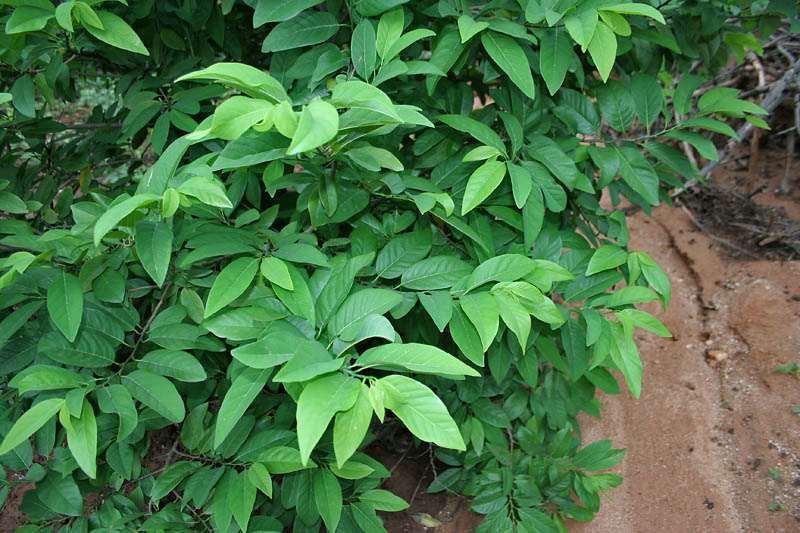
Branches

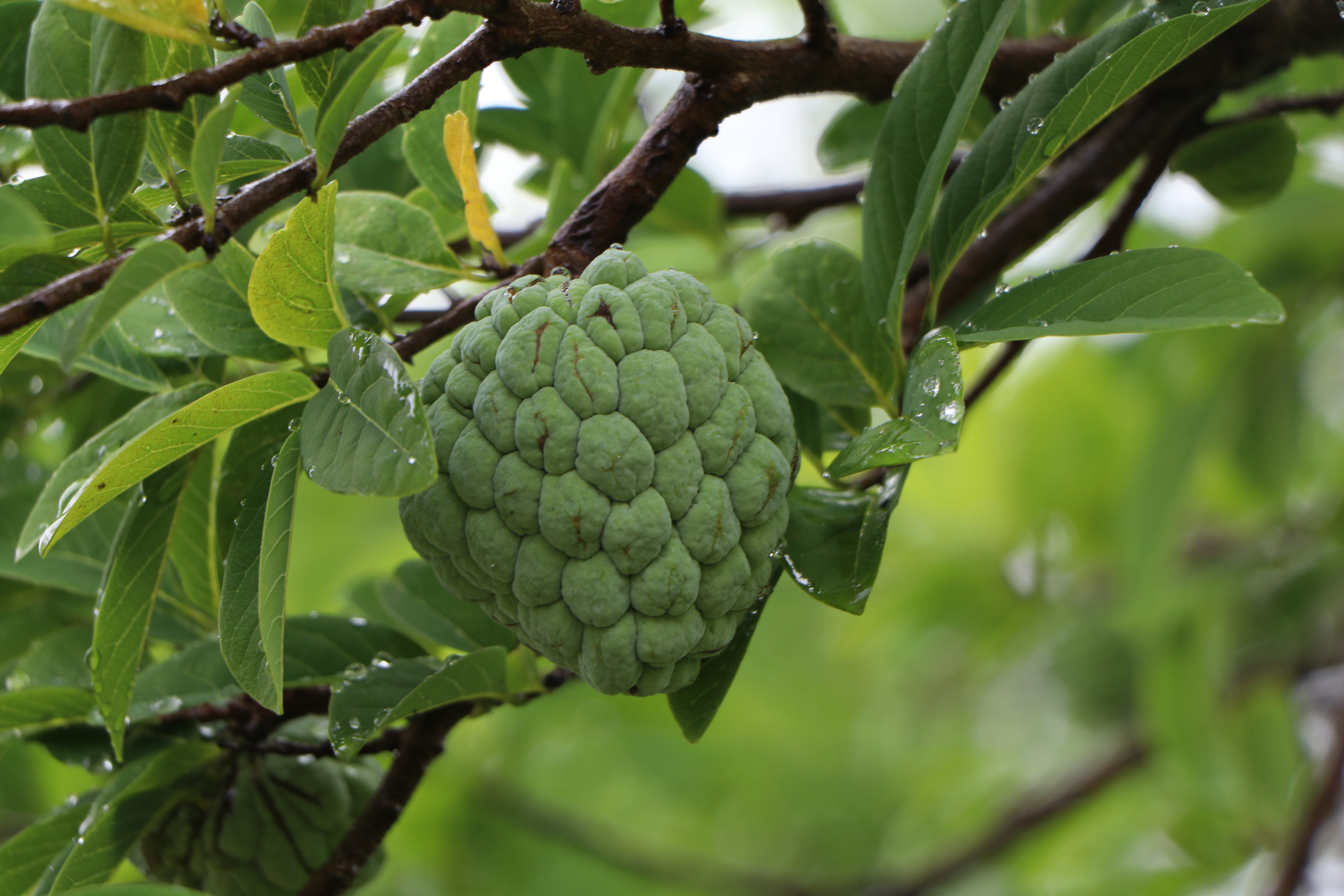
Annona squamosa fruit from Myanmar

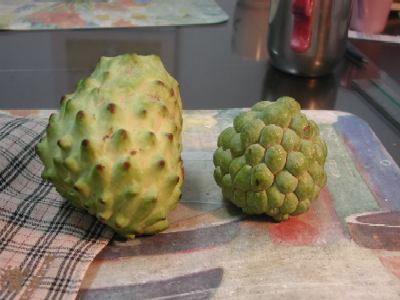
Sugar apple (right), with Taiwanese "pineapple shijia" (atemoya) (left)

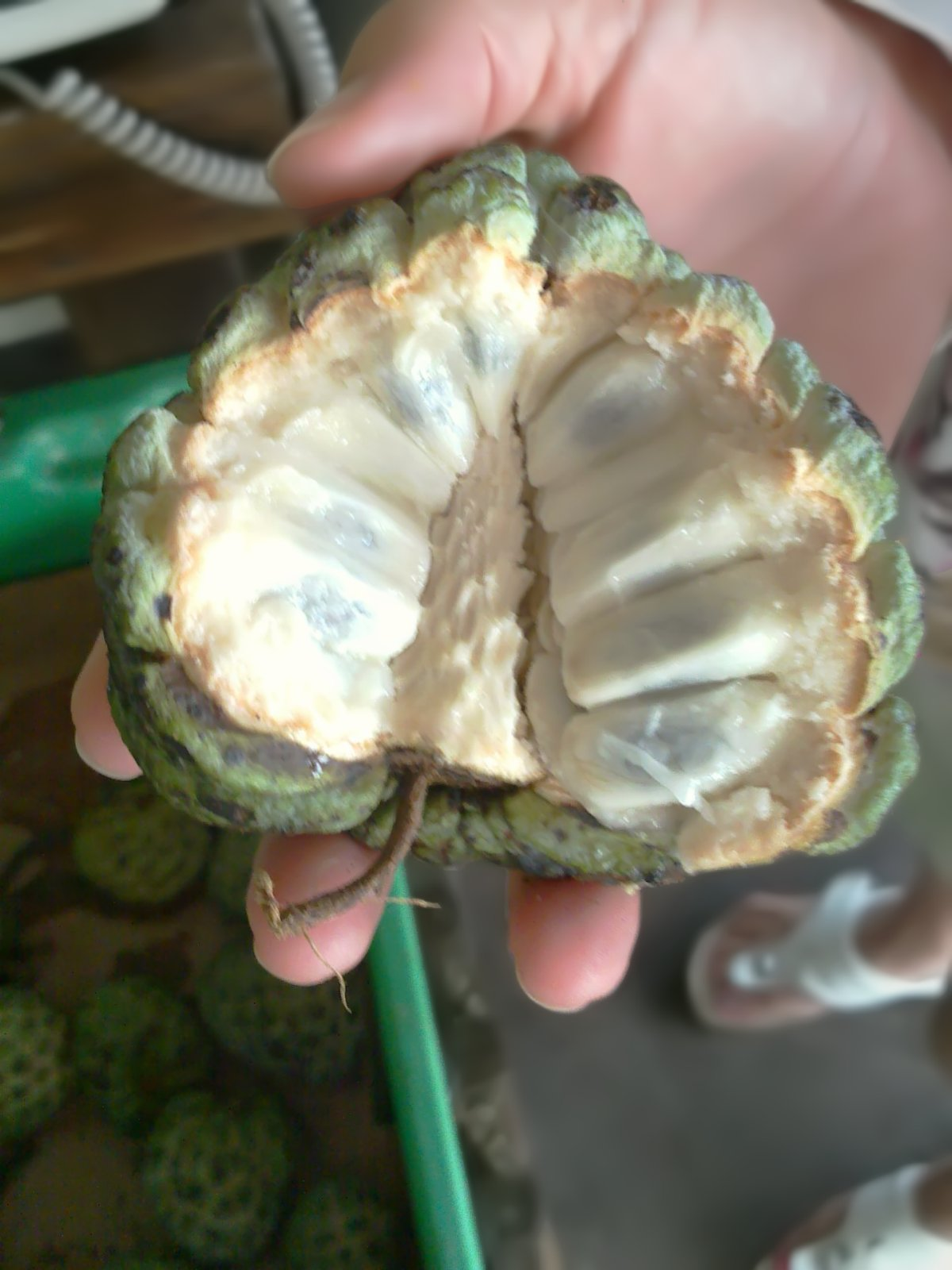
The sugar apple readily breaks open when ripe.

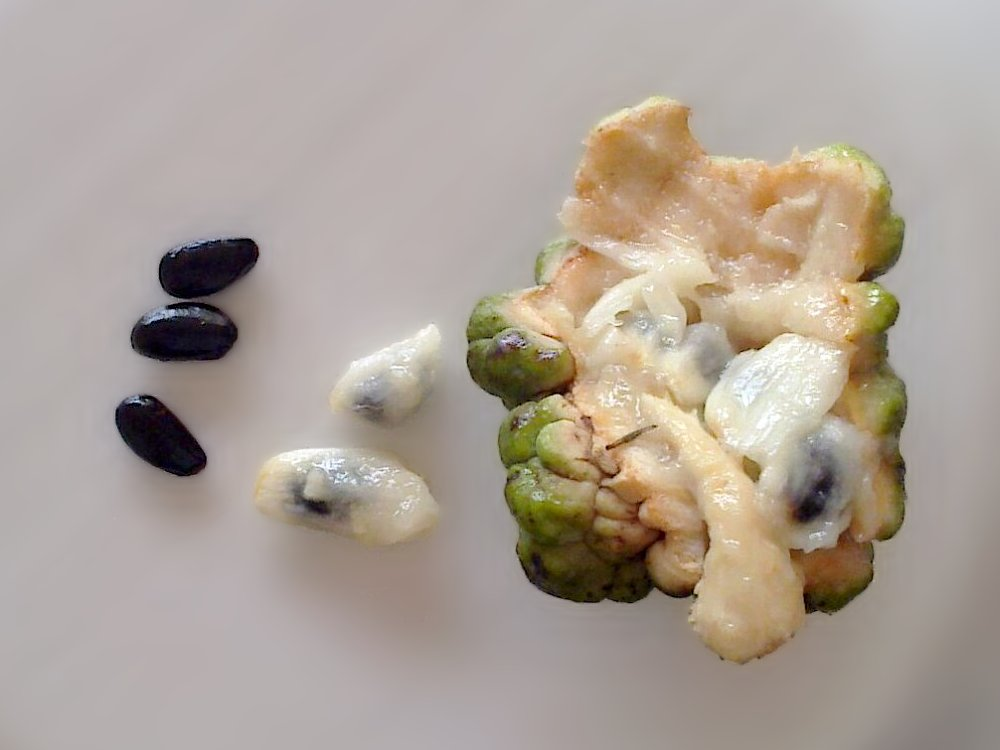
A deconstruction of a sugar apple shows a lobe of fruit and pulpy segments with seeds.

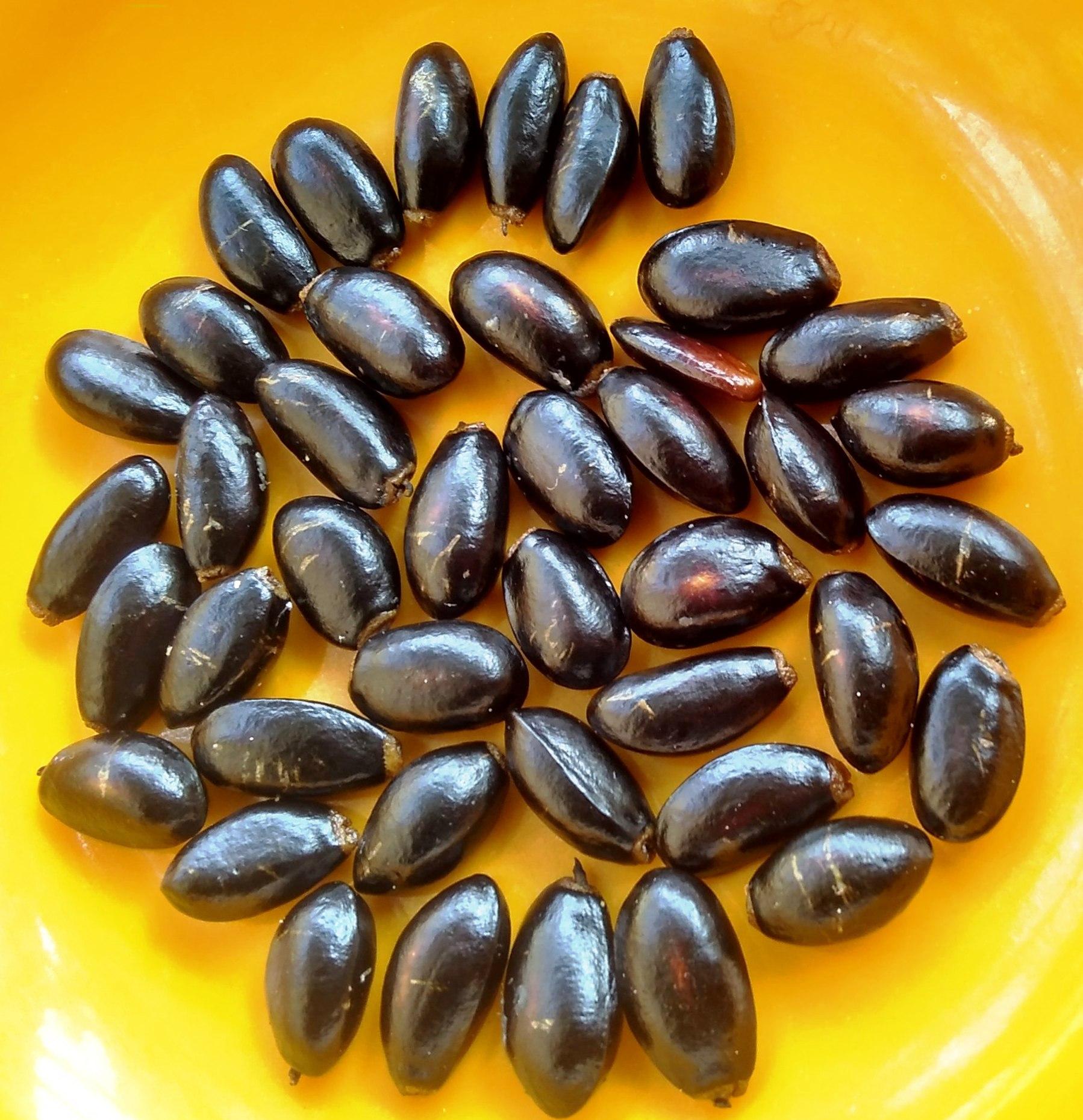
Sugar apple (Annona squamosa) seeds

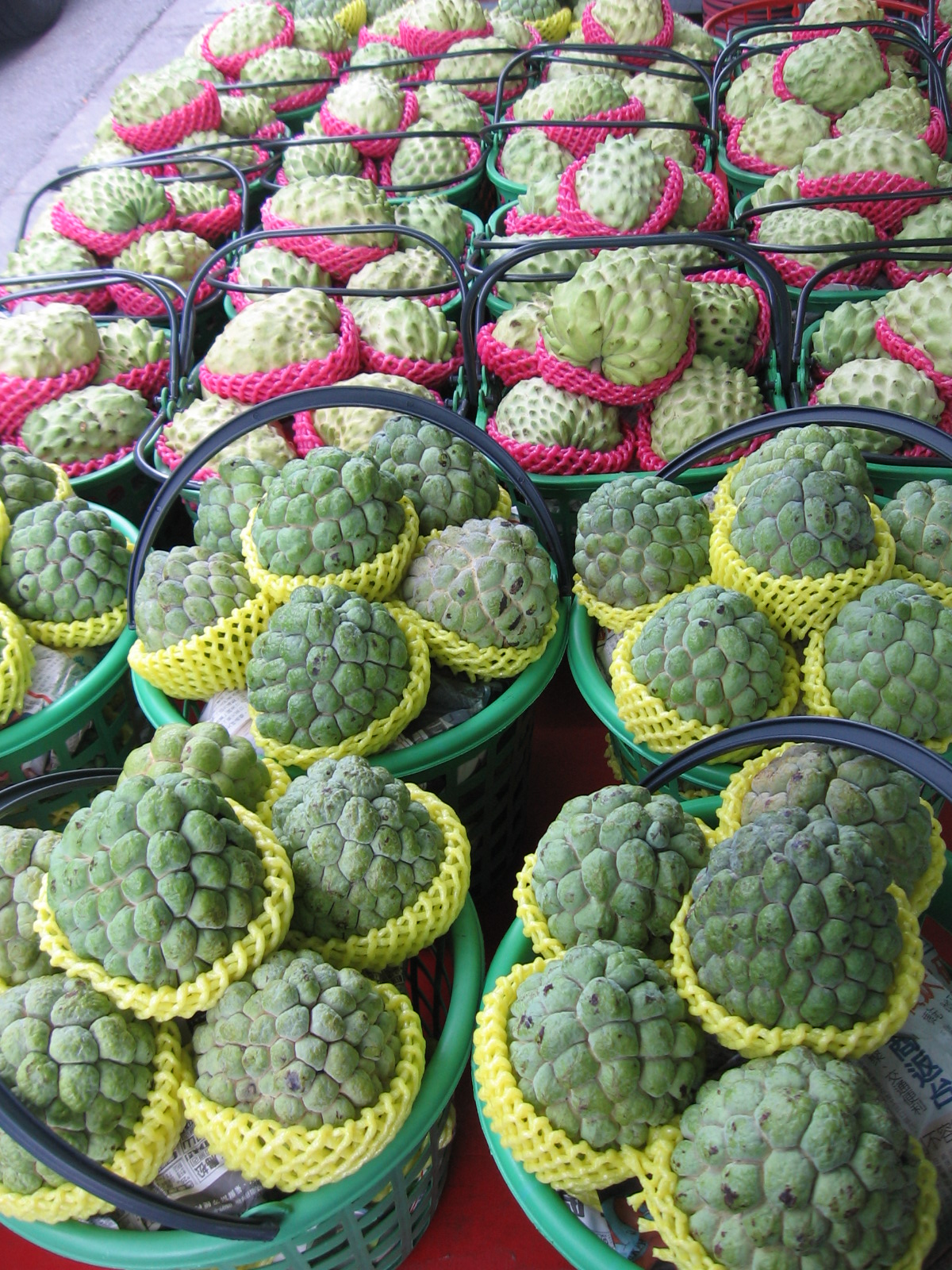
Sugar apples in Taitung, Taiwan

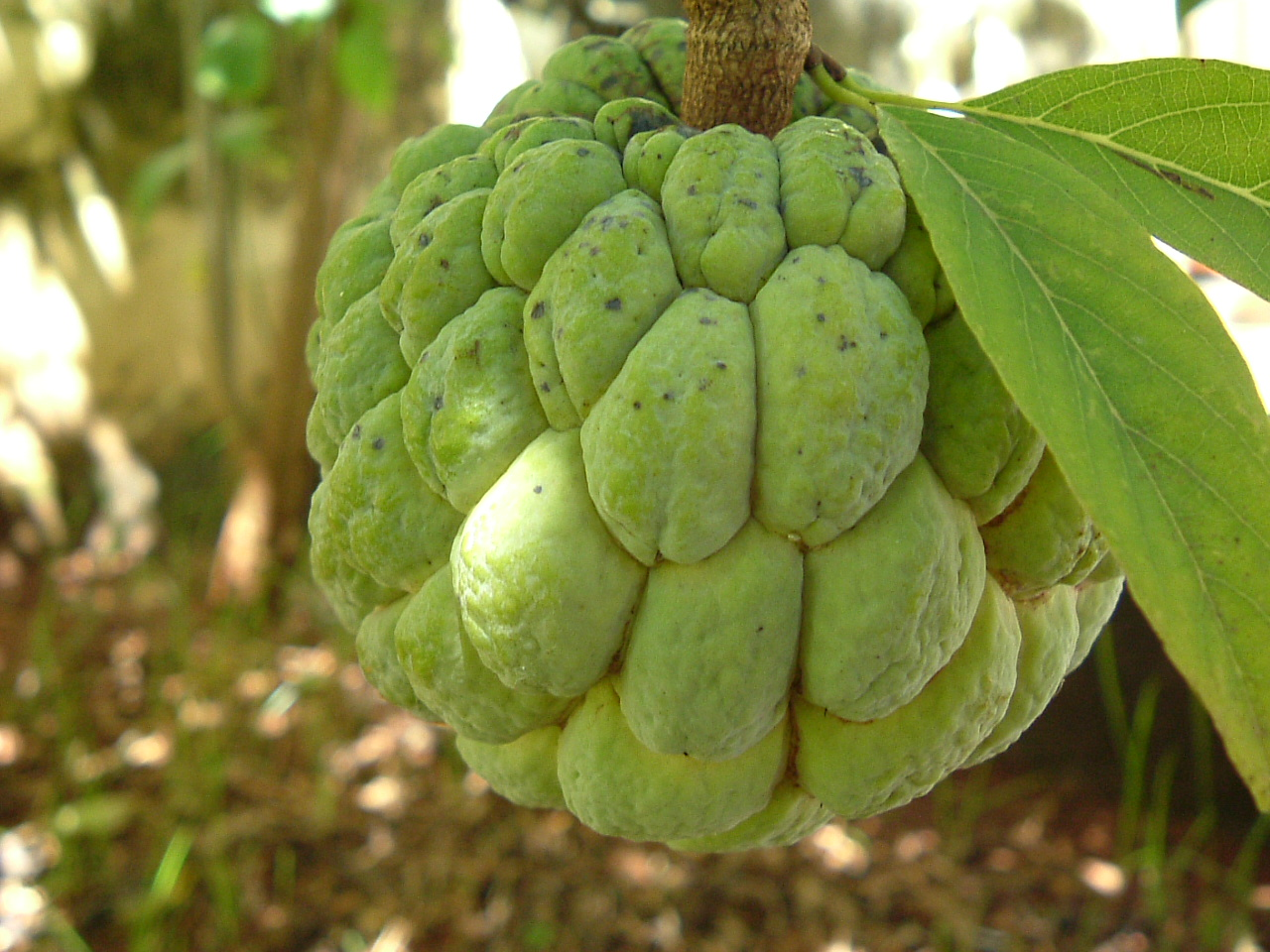
A sugar apple in Goiânia, Brazil

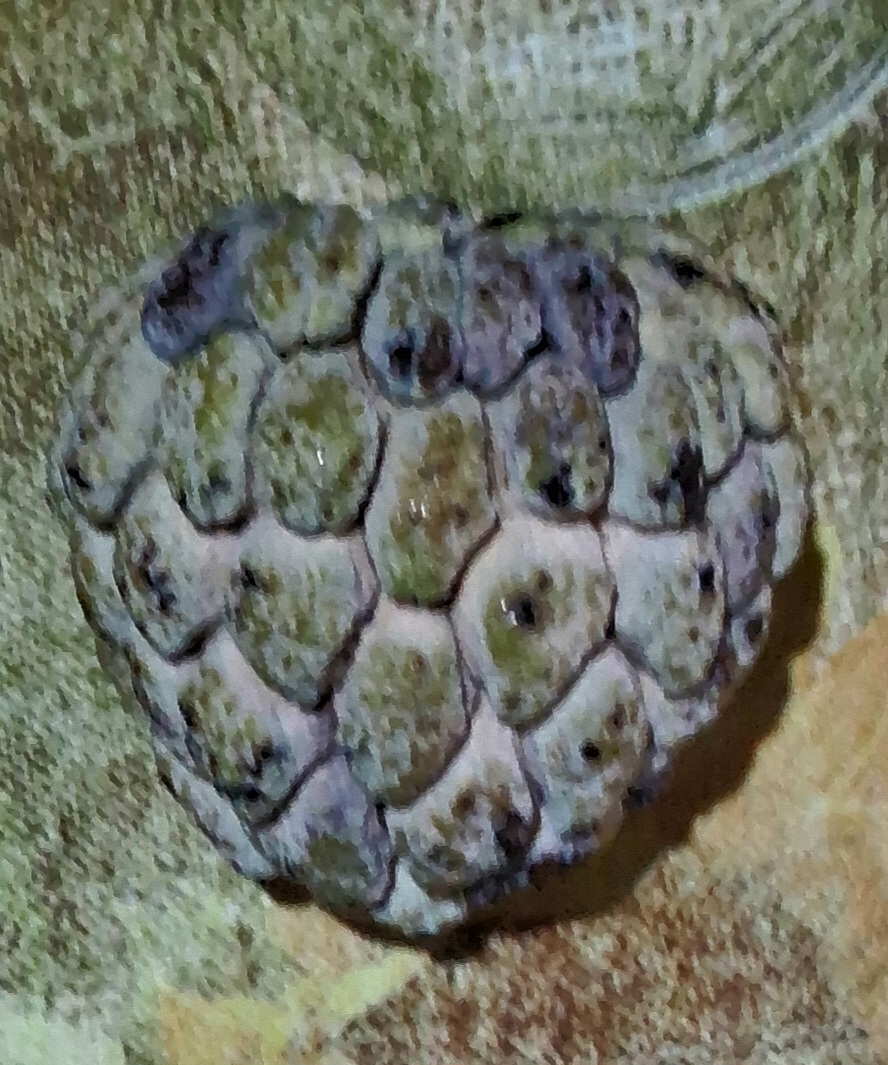
A sugar apple in a table
