= Fermentek =

Israeli biotech company

Fermentek Biotechnology Ltd.
- Type: Private
- Industry: Biotechnology
- Founded: 1995
- Headquarters: Israel
- Key people: Yosef Behrend; (CEO); Israel Behrend; (COO); Dovrat Brass; (Chief scientist); Maksim Gur; (Regulatory affairs)
- Products: Special bioactive compounds for research and active pharmaceuticals for clinical trials.
- Divisions: R&D; Microbiology; Chemistry; Natural products
- Website: http://www.fermentek.com

Fermentek Ltd. is a biotechnological company in the Atarot industrial zone of Jerusalem, Israel. It specializes in the research, development and manufacture of biologically active, natural products isolated from microorganisms as well as from other natural sources such as plants and algae.

The main microorganisms used are nonpathogenic actinomycetes, Nocardia and Streptomycetes. The fungi used are: Penicillium, Aspergillus, Fusarium and the like. None of these is a human pathogen.

Fermentek does not sell to individuals. Most of its products are marketed through major international distributors specializing in chemicals, under their own brand names. Nevertheless, Fermentek has specific impact on the biochemical market, especially in the field of mycotoxins.

Mycotoxins are toxic compounds produced by molds in human food and farm animal feeds, thus being economically important factors. Fermentek manufactures an extensive line of pure mycotoxins used as standards in food analysis. In some cases, such as Aflatoxin M2, Fermentek supplies the entire world's requirements.

In 2009, Fermentek announced a product family of highly standardized calibrant solutions of main mycotoxins. These are marketed under the brand name FermaSol. In 2010, it obtained ISO 13485 accreditation in connection with the production of starting materials for experimental drug production, and with manufacturing of reference standards of food contaminants.

None of Fermentek's products have been invented by it. Fermentek's aim is to make known compounds affordable to the scientific community.

Fermentek was founded by Dr. Yosef Behrend in 1994. It moved in 2004 to its new building, quadrupling its working space and greatly enlarging its manufacturing capacities.

== Technology ==
Fermentek operates fermentors ranging in size from 10 to 15,000 liters, with filter presses and centrifuges of matching capacity.

According to the company policy as declared at its official website, Fermentek uses only the "Classical" biotechnology approach. This means that only genetically unmodified natural microbial strains are employed, and no attempt is made to achieve mutants, neither random nor targeted.

== Main products ==
- Mycotoxins: Aflatoxin, Cytochalasin, Fumonisins, Gliotoxin, Patulin, Penicillic acid, Zearalenone, Tentoxin, Deoxynivalenol, Citrinin, T2 toxin, HT2 toxin, Tentoxin, Moniliformin, Deacetoxyscirpenol, Neosolaniol, Citreoviridin, Beauvericin, Nivalenol, Tenuazonic acid, Alternariol, Alternariol methyl ether
- Immunomodulators: Tacrolimus, Sirolimus, Ascomycin, Myriocin
- Ionophores: Valinomycin, Nonactin, Ionomycin
- Special antibiotics and molecular biology reagents. Anisomycin, Thiolutin, Wortmannin, K252a, Staurosporine, K252C, Bafilomycin, Alamethicin, Leptomycin, A23187, Chelerythrine, Oligomycin, Trichostatin A, Cerulenin, Aphidicolin
- Experimental drugs and drug precursors: Parthenolide, Puromycin, Rapamycin, Anisomycin, Thapsigargin, cyclopamine, Thiostrepton, Staurosporine, Mithramycin, Midostaurin, Wortmannin, K252a, Geldanamycin and its derivates: 17-DMAG, 17-AAG

== See also ==
- Fungal isolates
- Streptomyces isolates
