= Streptomyces luteireticuli =

Scientific classification
- Domain: Bacteria
- Kingdom: Bacillati
- Phylum: Actinomycetota
- Class: Actinomycetes
- Order: Streptomycetales
- Family: Streptomycetaceae
- Genus: Streptomyces
- Species: S. luteireticuli

Binomial name
- Streptomyces luteireticuli (ex Katoh and Arai 1957) Hatano et al. 2003

Type strain
- IFM KS 2-74, ATCC 13422, ATCC 27446, BCRC 15185, CBS 567.50, CBS 723.72, CCRC 15185, CIP 108150, DSM 40509, IFMKS2-74, IFO 13422, ISP 5509, JCM 4788, KCC S-0788, KS 2-74, NBRC 101284, NBRC 13422, NCB 81, NRRL B-12435, RIA 1383, SAJ

Synonyms
- "Streptomyces luteoreticuli" Koyama et al. 1969; "Streptoverticillium luteoreticuli" Katoh and Arai 1957

Species of bacterium

Streptomyces luteireticuli is a bacterium species from the genus of Streptomyces. Streptomyces luteireticuli produces mycometoxin A, mycometoxin B, aureothricin and thiolutin.

== See also ==
- List of Streptomyces species
