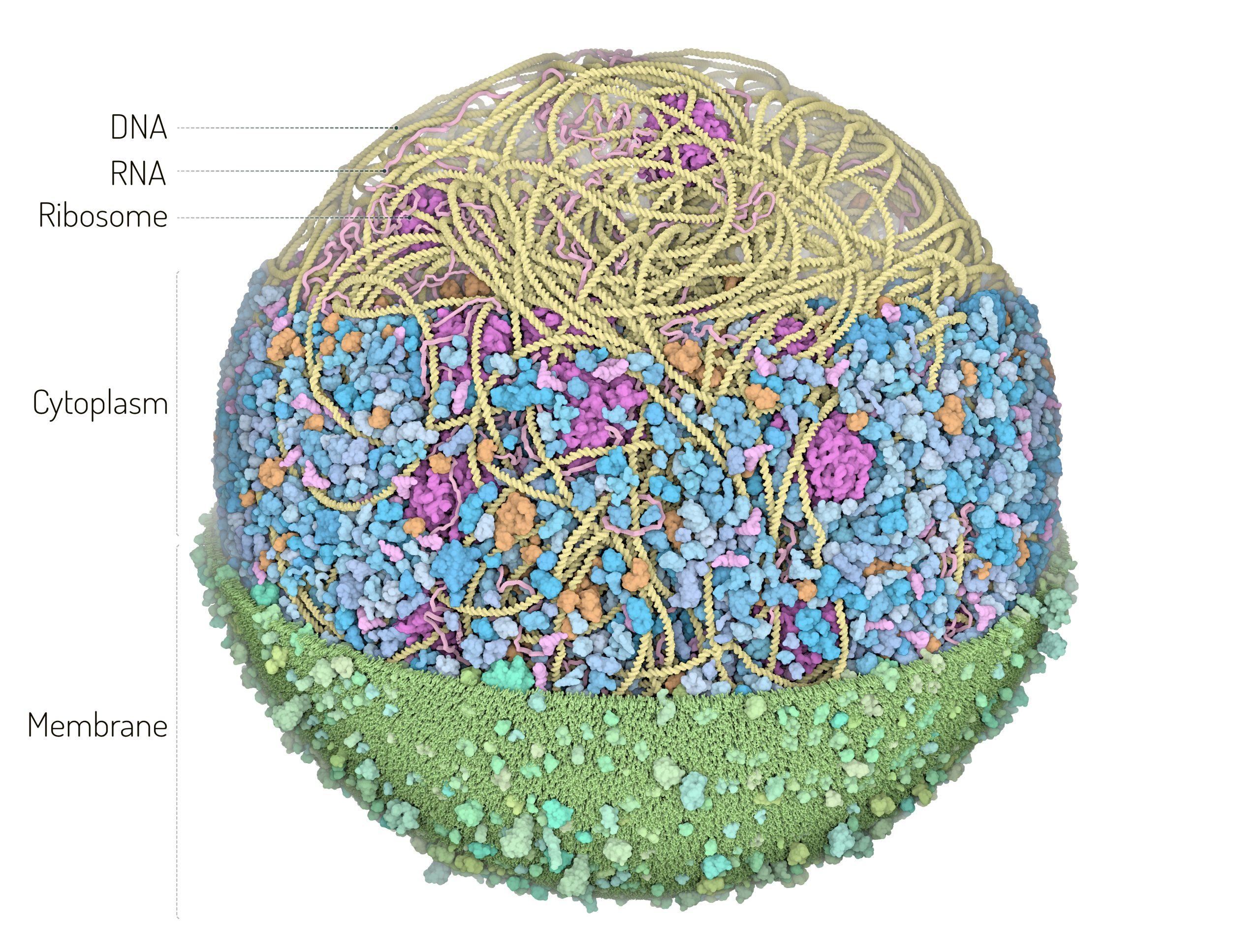
- 3D whole cell model of a Mycoplasma genitalium cell. Note this model does not include the terminal attachment organelle.

Scientific classification
- Domain: Bacteria
- Kingdom: Bacillati
- Phylum: Mycoplasmatota
- Class: Mollicutes
- Order: Mycoplasmatales
- Family: Mycoplasmataceae
- Genus: Mycoplasma
- Species: M. genitalium

Binomial name
- Mycoplasma genitalium (Tully et al. 1983) Gupta et al. 2018

Synonyms
- Mycoplasma genitalium Tully et al. 1983

= Mycoplasma genitalium =

Mycoplasmoides genitalium

Species of bacterium

Mycoplasma genitalium (also known as MG, Mgen, or Mycoplasmoides genitalium) is a sexually transmitted, pathogenic bacterium that lives on the mucous epithelial cells of the urinary and genital tracts in humans and is known to cause acute and chronic conditions in both men and women. The bacterium was first isolated from the urogenital tract of humans in 1981 and was identified as a new species of Mycoplasma in 1983. Mgen is associated with urethritis in men and cervicitis and pelvic inflammatory disease (PID) in women, as well an increased risk of HIV transmission. Rising rates of resistance to macrolide antibiotics such as azithromycin has complicated treatment, which will shift treatments toward fluoroquinolones like moxifloxacin.

== Symptoms of infection ==
Mgen presents similar symptoms to that of Chlamydia trachomatis infection and has shown higher incidence rates compared to both Chlamydia trachomatis and Neisseria gonorrhoeae infections in some populations.

Infection with Mgen can be symptomatic or asymptomatic. Both men and women may experience inflammation in the urethra (urethritis), characterized by mucopurulent discharge in the urinary tract and burning while urinating. Associations with reproductive tract conditions can be stronger when Mgen is present as a co-infection.

There is a consistent association of Mgen infection and female reproductive tract syndromes. In women, it causes cervicitis and pelvic inflammatory diseases, including endometritis and salpingitis. Additionally, Mgen is significantly associated with increased risk of preterm birth and spontaneous abortion. Women may experience bleeding after sex, and it is also linked with tubal factor infertility. This pathogen may latently infect the chorionic villi tissues of pregnant women, thereby impacting pregnancy outcome. Infertility risk in women is also strongly associated with infection, though the evidence for some of these associations is limited or inconsistent. Unlike other mycoplasmas, the infection is not associated with bacterial vaginosis.

Untreated Mgen infection in women has been associated with an approximately twofold increased risk of cervicitis and pelvic inflammatory disease, as well as possible links to infertility and adverse pregnancy outcomes, Treatment stops the infection but does not reverse permanent damage that has already occurred.

For men, the most common signs are painful urination or a watery discharge from the penis. Polymerase chain reaction (PCR) analyses indicated that Mgen is a cause of acute and chronic non-gonococcal urethritis (NGU), including persistent or recurrent cases, and it is responsible for 15 percent to 20 percent of symptomatic NGU cases in men. Evidence for involvement in prostatitis or epididymitis is limited, and current evidence suggests Mgen is not associated with male infertility.

Mgen is highly associated with the intensity of HIV infection and infection intensity. Research is ongoing to determine if Mgen could play a role in the development of prostate and ovarian cancers and lymphomas in some individuals, but these studies have yet to find conclusive evidence to suggest a link.

== Diagnosis ==
Mgen is a fastidious organism that grows slowly in culture, making its detection and isolation from clinical specimens extremely difficult. Culture growth can take up to six months and is generally limited to research settings. Mgen lacks a cell wall and is therefore intrinsically resistant to antibiotics that inhibit bacterial cell wall synthesis.

Research has concluded that nucleic acid amplification tests (NAAT), which detect pathogen-specific DNA or RNA, are the primary method for detection of Mgen. For NAAT, the CDC lists the cleared sample types: urine and urethral, penile meatal, and endocervical and vaginal swabs. The CDC recommends NAAT testing for men with recurrent urethritis and women with recurrent cervicitis, and it recommends considering the test for women with PID. It also recommends against screening asymptomatic people and against extragenital testing. The CDC reports macrolide resistance markers in about 44% to 90% of cases in the US, Canada, Western Europe and Australia, with much lower quinolone resistance. Because macrolide resistance is common, positive NAAT for the pathogen should be ideally tested for macrolide resistance mutations, which are strongly correlated to azithromycin treatment failures, owing to rapid rates of mutation of the pathogen.

According to the European guidelines, the indication for commencement of diagnosis for Mgen infection are:

1. Detection of nucleic acid (DNA and/or RNA) specific for Mgen in a clinical specimen
2. Current partners of individuals who tested positive for Mgen should be treated with the same antimicrobial as the index patient
3. If current partner does not attend for evaluation and testing, treatment with the same regimen as given to the index patient should be offered on epidemiological grounds
4. On epidemiological grounds for sexual contacts in the previous 3 months; ideally, specimens for a Mgen NAAT should be collected before treatment and treatment should not be given before the results are available

Screening for Mgen with a combination of detection and macrolide resistance mutations provides the adequate information required to develop personalized antimicrobial treatments in order to optimize patient management and control the spread of antimicrobial resistance (AMR).

== Treatment ==
Treatment of Mgen may be difficult due to antimicrobial resistance and lack of routine testing.

Resistance is developing towards second-line antimicrobials like fluoroquinolone. This resistance occurs in the parC and gyrA genes, and mutations have been found in 45.5% and 18.2% of isolates, respectively. In parC, the S83I substitution is the most common, and is associated with moxifloxacin treatment failure. When this mutation occurs along with the gyrA-M95I mutation, treatment failure is twice as likely. Furthermore, isolates associated with fluoroquinolone resistance also had macrolide resistant mutations.

To avoid resistance development, treatment often begins with doxycycline, a tetracycline, followed by either azithromycin, a macrolide, or moxifloxacin, a fluoroquinolone. These treatments vary by location and availability of resistance testing, but it is known that beta-lactam antibiotics are ineffective against Mgen because it does not have a cell wall. There is no evidence that patients with or without HIV should receive different treatment plans.

=== The United States ===
The U.S. Centers for Disease Control and Prevention (CDC) recommends a step-wise treatment approach for Mgen with doxycycline for seven days followed immediately by a seven-day course of moxifloxacin due to high rates of macrolide resistance.

If resistance assay testing is available, and the Mgen is sensitive to macrolides, the CDC recommends a seven-day course of doxycycline followed by a four-day course of azithromycin. Although the majority of Mgen strains are sensitive to moxifloxacin, resistance has been reported. If resistance testing or moxifloxacin is unavailable, the CDC recommends seven days of doxycycline followed by a four-day course of azithromycin. Because macrolide resistance is undetermined but highly likely, a test of cure twenty-one days after treatment is recommended.

=== Europe ===
As of 2025, the British Association for Sexual Health and HIV (BASHH) has updated its guidelines for treatment. If macrolide resistance is known, patients are recommended doxycycline for seven days, followed by moxifloxacin for seven days. Conversely, if macrolide resistance is unknown or if Mgen is macrolide-sensitive, the patient is recommended doxycycline for seven days, followed by azithromycin for three days.

In the case of treatment failure, doxycycline is prescribed for seven days, followed by pristinamycin, a streptogramin, for ten days. This treatment has a 75% cure rate. Alternatively, patients may be recommended pristinamycine, minocycline, or lefamulin as third-line antibiotics.

In 2010 and 2011, macrolide resistance in Norway, Sweden, and Denmark had increased. Greenland, in particular, experienced a 100% increase of resistance, which was thought to be because of azithromycin's common use to treat C. trachomatis. To combat macrolide resistance, Russia prescribes 500 mg josamycin three times a day for 10 days.

Furthermore, according to UK Health Security Agency, men who have sex with men are much more likely to contract macrolide-resistant or fluoroquinolone-resistant Mgen. There was no significant difference between age groups, though the specific mutations related to macrolide or fluoroquinolone resistance differed between patients younger or older than 45.

=== India ===
Azithromycin is considered the first-line antibiotic against Mgen because macrolides have high cure rates. It is recommended that a beginning dosage of 500mg is followed by 2-5 days of 250mg. 500mg josamycin may also be used for an extended period of 10 days to combat macrolide-resistant Mgen. However, in the case of macrolide resistance, moxifloxacin may be used for 7-14 days. This antibiotic is extremely successful in India despite having resistance patterns in other regions. In contrast, doxycycline is not often prescribed because of its low cure rates.

Many new antibiotics are being tested against macrolide-resistant Mgen. Pristinamycin, in particular, is a third-line antibiotic that is effective against both macrolide and quinolone-resistant Mgen.

== Epidemiology ==
Prevalence of Mgen within the general population tends to vary between countries. Countries with lower Human Development Indices (HDI) may have a higher prevalence of Mgen in the general population than those of higher HDI countries. However, when comparing specific variables such as sex, there are no statistical differences between the two groups.

Some cohorts may have higher rates of Mgen than the general population. A study examining several sexually transmitted infections among a cohort of 525 pregnant women in Chad found a higher prevalence of Mgen (13.33%) compared to other sexually transmitted infections, such as Neisseria gonorrhoeae (5.14%), Chlamydia trachomatis (0.95%), and Trichomonas vaginalis (4.57%). Similarly, among HIV-positive women in the United States, Mgen prevalence was reported to be higher than both C. trachomatis and N. gonorrhoeae. However, among the general adult population of higher HDI countries, prevalence of C. trachomatis was reported to be 4.3% in women and 3.6% in men compared to around 2% for Mgen, including both men and women. The differences in Mgen prevalence among certain cohorts has further implications for control strategies. For instance, in Britain, Mgen prevalence was higher in older men and women, indicating that screening programs targeting younger groups would likely miss many infections.

Several risk factors associated with higher risk of Mgen infection have been identified. Among pregnant women in Chad, this includes living in rural areas rather than urban, being less than 25 years of age, and having an occupation outside the home. Among female students in the UK, other risk factors, such as having greater than 2 sexual partners, smoking, and being of black ethnicity, were also reported.

== Cell biology ==
Mgen is a prokaryotic bacterium that evolved from a gram-positive, clostridium-like ancestor and has since lost genes that code for the enzymes that allow it to reproduce without a host. Therefore, Mgen needs a host's growth factors to keep reproducing.

=== Morphology ===
Mgen is a flask-shaped cell with a narrow terminal tip organelle that is crucial for mobility through mucosal tissue and attachment to host cell surfaces. The bacterial cell is slightly elongated, somewhat like a vase, and measures 0.6–0.7 μm in length, 0.3–0.4 μm at the broadest region, and 0.06–0.08 μm at the tip. The base is broad while the tip is stretched into a narrow neck, which terminates with a cap. The terminal region has a specialized region called nap, which is absent in other mycoplasmas. Serological tests indicated that the bacterium was not related to known species of Mycoplasma. The comparison of genome sequences with other urinogenital bacteria, such as M. hominis and Ureaplasma parvum, revealed that Mgen is significantly different, especially in the energy-generating pathways, although it shared a core genome of ~250 protein-encoding genes.

The tip organelle is divided into three parts that are each made up of different proteins: terminal button, segmented pair plates, and wheel complex. The proteins that make up each part of the tip structure are associated with different aspects of Mgen motility. Because Mgen lacks a cell wall, it attaches to host cells by cytoadherance, using lipid associated membrane proteins that encode for the terminal tip organelle. The segmented pair plates of Mgen is a core of dense electrons which is anchored to the cell membrane. The end of this core is in contact with the wheel complex and the wheel complex contains the proteins MG219, MG200, MG386, and MG491 which aid in the gliding motility of the bacteria. Although Mgen lacks secreted virulence factors, the protein MG186 degrades host nucleic acids due to it being a calcium-dependent membrane-associated nuclease.

Mgen lacks a peptidoglycan cell wall and therefore contains no cell surface markers. This means that Mgen is more susceptible to changes in shape and is more affected by environmental pressures like osmosis. The lack of a cell wall also contributes to its resistance to common antimicrobials that inhibit bacterial cell wall synthesis.

=== Cellular reproduction ===
Mgen reproduces asexually by binary fission. Mgen has no cell wall, so it does not need to form one during cell division, like most bacteria do when separating.

In most bacteria, a protein called FtsZ forms a ring around the middle of the cell and signals where to split during cytokinesis, which helps drive peptidoglycan synthesis in walled bacteria. Mgen has the gene for ftsZ, but it can still divide without it. When scientists removed the gene, the cells still grew and divided, although some looked elongated prior to splitting, but that was the only change in the cytokinesis process when no ftsZ was present. Mgen was able to separate during cytokinesis without ftsZ due to its motile machinery. Mgen has only four genes in its main cell division group: mraZ, mraW, MG_223, and ftsZ, which is fewer than in most bacteria. Even though ftsZ is not needed for Mgen in some cases, ftsZ is still important, as its position inside the cell changes as the cell prepares to divide. Another gene, mraZ appears to help regulate ftsZ and the other gene levels in check, because all of the other genes are made in much larger amounts when mraZ is removed, making mraZ a transcriptional repressor. MraW is important for cellular growth, as it helps regulate protein expression at a post-transcriptional level. MG_223 is thought to encode a "hypothetical protein" because research has not characterized what the protein does.

=== Genome and proteins ===
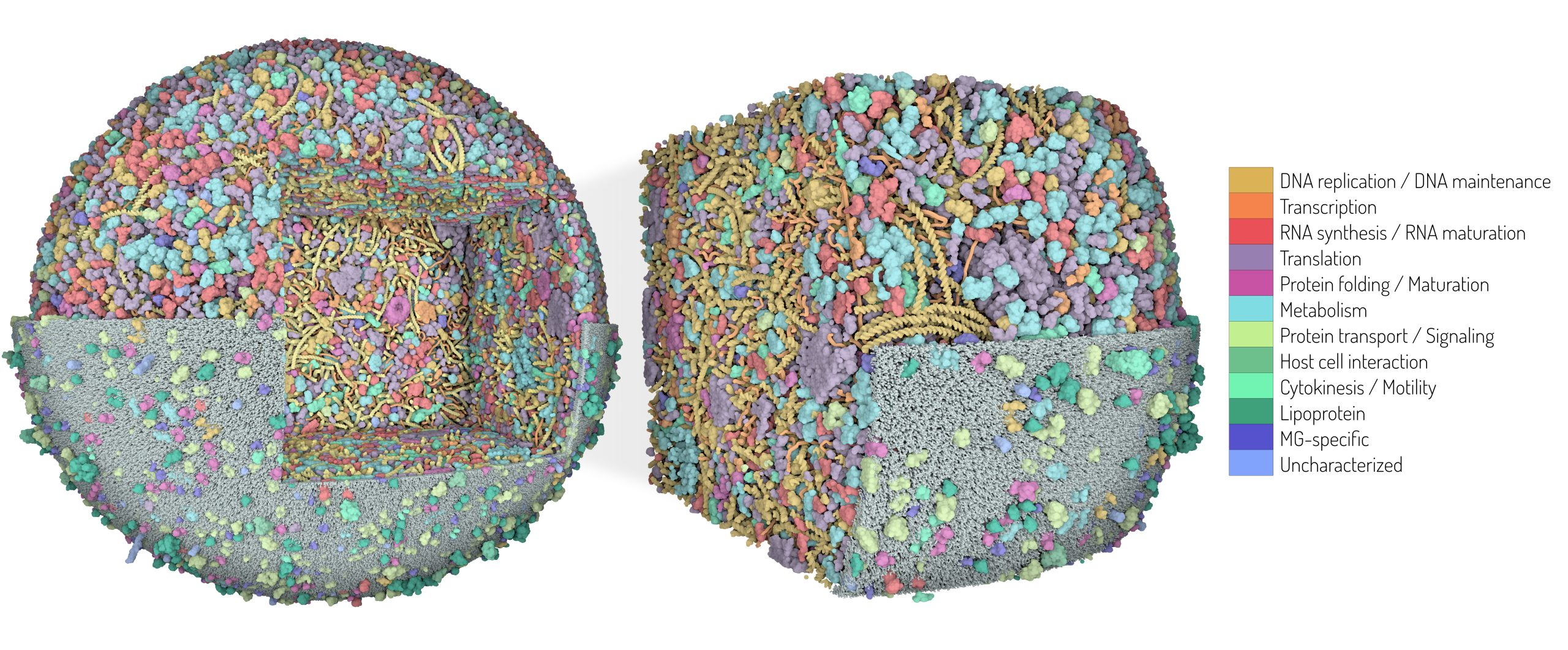
3D model of the Mycoplasma genitalium cell obtained with CellPACKgpu. The horizontal clipping plane shows the cytoplasmic environment on top and the membrane with associated proteins in the bottom. An additional clipping plane carves out a cubic section of the model, magnified on the right. Proteins colored by biological function.

The genome of Mgen strain G37^{T} consists in one circular DNA molecule of 580,070 base pairs. There is limited divergence among clinical strains of Mgen. All strains retain the small genome size. Though, the mgpB gene displays high variability due to recombination.

In the originally discovered genome sequence, 374 of the 470 predicted proteins had at least a "putative" function assigned. 96 genes had no matches to any known proteins in other organisms. In 2025, 30 years after the genome was published, 26 proteins are still annotated (in Uniprot) as "probable" (e.g. rbgA/MG442 is probably the ribosome biogenesis GTPase A) and 28 proteins are annotated as "putative" (e.g. MG125 is a Putative phosphatase [EC 3.1.3.-]). 146 proteins remain annotated as "uncharacterized", with about a dozen having some predicted function. The function of more than 100 proteins thus appears to remain largely mysterious.

Two proteins, MG218 and MG317, are known to cluster at this tip and support the cell like a cytoskeleton. Once this tip attaches to the tissue of a host, cytoplasmic enzymes are translocated to the surface, and glyceraldehyde 3 phosphate dehydrogenase from the glycolytic pathway acts as a ligand on cervical mucin. These lipoproteins vary across Mgen cultures due to variation in antibiotic resistance, but it is unconfirmed if this variation is due to an environmentally controlled transduction pathway or spontaneous mutation.

== History ==
Mgen was originally isolated in 1980 from urethral specimens of two male patients with non-gonococcal urethritis in the genitourinary medicine (GUM) clinic at St Mary's Hospital, Paddington, London. It was reported in 1981 by a team led by Joseph G. Tully and was officially named Mycoplasma genitalium in 1983.

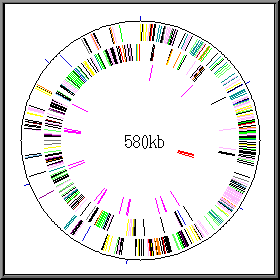
Gene map of Mycoplasma genitalium. Circularly arranged colored bands are the protein-coding genes and other loci in their position in the DNA. The genome has 580,070 base pairs (580 kb).

Scott N. Peterson and his team at the University of North Carolina at Chapel Hill reported the first genetic map using pulsed-field gel electrophoresis in 1991. They performed an initial study of the genome using sequencing in 1993, by which they found 100,993 nucleotides and 390 protein-coding genes. Collaborating with researchers at The Institute for Genomic Research (TIGR; now the J. Craig Venter Institute), which included Craig Venter, they completed the genome sequence in 1995 using shotgun sequencing. Only 470 predicted coding regions were identified in 1995, including genes required for DNA replication, transcription and translation, DNA repair, cellular transport, and energy metabolism. It was the second complete bacterial genome ever sequenced, after Haemophilus influenzae. Later data from KEGG reports 476 protein-coding genes and 43 RNA genes, totaling 519. It is unclear where the "525" gene count for the G37^{T} stems from and what gene calling procedure was used. The current genome annotation in the Uniprot reference proteome lists 483 proteins.

In 2006, the team at the J. Craig Venter Institute reported that only 382 genes are essential for biological functions. The small genome of Mgen made it the organism of choice in The Minimal Genome Project, a study to find the smallest set of genetic material necessary to sustain life.

On 6 October 2007, Craig Venter announced that a team of scientists led by Nobel laureate Hamilton Smith at the J. Craig Venter Institute had successfully constructed synthetic DNA with which they planned to make the first synthetic genome. Reporting in The Guardian, Venter said that they had stitched together a DNA strand containing 381 genes, consisting of 580,000 base pairs, based on the genome of Mgen. On 24 January 2008, they announced the successful creation of a synthetic bacterium, which they named Mycoplasma genitalium JCVI-1.0 (the name of the strain indicating J. Craig Venter Institute with its specimen number). They synthesised and assembled the complete 582,970-base pair genome of the bacterium. The final stages of synthesis involved cloning the DNA into the bacterium E. coli for nucleotide production and sequencing. This produced large fragments of approximately 144,000 base pairs or 1/4th of the whole genome. Finally, the products were cloned inside the yeast Saccharomyces cerevisiae to synthesize the 580,000 base pairs. The molecular size of the synthetic bacterial genome is 360,110 kilodaltons (kDa). Printed in 10-point font, the letters of the genome cover 147 pages.

On 20 July 2012, Stanford University and the J. Craig Venter Institute announced successful simulation of the complete life cycle of a Mgen cell, in the journal Cell. The entire organism is modeled in terms of its molecular components, integrating all cellular processes into a single model. Using object-oriented programming to model the interactions of 28 categories of molecules, including DNA, RNA, proteins, and metabolites, and running on a 128-computer Linux cluster, the simulation takes 10 hours for a single Mgen cell to divide once—about the same time the actual cell takes—and generates half a gigabyte of data.

In 2018, Gupta et al. proposed to change the name of Mycoplasma genitalium to Mycoplasmoides genitalium on phylogenetic grounds, reflecting the existing knowledge that Mgen is not very related to other Mycoplasma. The change became correct name under the International Code of Nomenclature of Prokaryotes (ICNP, "Code") with Validation List 184, published by the ICSP ("Committee"). Mycoplasmologists working in the field generally oppose this renaming. In 2019, they published an opinion paper arguing that even though the phylogenetic methods are valid, Gupta's renaming scheme causes too many changes, which is impractical and confusing. They cite some essential principles of the Code, such as "no unnecessary new names", "aim at stability of names", and "avoid or reject the use of names which may cause error or confusion". However, the 2019 argument for preserving old names was rejected by the Committee in Opinion 122 of 2022, where it was ruled that the argument incorrectly cited the Code. The Opinion emphasizes that use of an older validly published name remains acceptable under the Code.

In 2026, gene prediction analysis using Geneious Prime, and later confirmed by PCR, revealed that 59% of Mgen sequences contained translocations of 16S, 23S and 5S ribosomal RNA. Mutations in the 23S rRNA gene of Mgen have been linked with clinical treatment failure and high levels in vitro macrolide resistance. This mutation can be found in strains from Australia, Europe, and Asia with similarities of 91% or higher.

== See also ==
- Smallest organisms
