= Streptomyces kasugaensis =

Scientific classification
- Domain: Bacteria
- Kingdom: Bacillati
- Phylum: Actinomycetota
- Class: Actinomycetes
- Order: Streptomycetales
- Family: Streptomycetaceae
- Genus: Streptomyces
- Species: S. kasugaensis

Binomial name
- Streptomyces kasugaensis Hamada et al. 1995

Type strain
- A-9989-A, A-9989-B, A-9989A, ATCC 15714, ATCC 15715, ATCC 19154, BCRC 12349, BCRC 12356, BCRC 14929, CCRC 12349, CCRC 12356, CCRC 14929, DSM 40819, IFO 13851, IMC S-0455, JCM 4208, KCC S-0208, KCTC 1078, KCTC 1308, KCTC 2110, KCTC 2113, L 130, M338-M1, M338-M1-U2, M338/M1, MTCC 6919, NBRC 13851, NCIMB 12239, NCIMB 12717, NCIMB 12718

Species of bacterium

Streptomyces kasugaensis is a bacterium species from the genus of Streptomyces which has been isolated from soil from the city of Nara in Japan. Streptomyces kasugaensis produces kasugamycin and thiolutin.

== See also ==
- List of Streptomyces species
