= Streptomyces melanosporofaciens =

Scientific classification
- Domain: Bacteria
- Kingdom: Bacillati
- Phylum: Actinomycetota
- Class: Actinomycetes
- Order: Streptomycetales
- Family: Streptomycetaceae
- Genus: Streptomyces
- Species: S. melanosporofaciens

Binomial name
- Streptomyces melanosporofaciens Arcamone et al. 1959

Type strain
- ATCC 25473, BCC 7127, BCRC 12064, CBS 883.69, CCRC 12064, CGMCC 4.1742, DSM 40318, Farmitalia1573, IFO 13061, ISP 5318, JCM 4495, KCC S-0495, KCCS-0495, NBRC 13061, NCIMB 12978, NRRL B-12234, NRRL-ISP 5318, RIA 1253, VKM Ac-1864

Species of bacterium

Streptomyces melanosporofaciens is a bacterium species from the genus of Streptomyces which has been isolated from soil in Italy. Streptomyces melanosporofaciens produces elaiophylin, cyclooctatin, geldanamycin, chilaphylin and melanosporin. A mutant of Streptomyces melanosporofaciens has the ability to protect potatoes from common scab.

== See also ==
- List of Streptomyces species
