= MGEN =

MGEN may refer to:

- Mutuelle générale de l'Éducation nationale, a social security organization in France

MGen or Mgén may refer to:

- Major General, a rank in various armed forces

Mgen may refer to:

- Mycoplasma genitalium, a sexually transmitted bacterium
