= Streptomyces geldanamycininus =

Scientific classification
- Domain: Bacteria
- Kingdom: Bacillati
- Phylum: Actinomycetota
- Class: Actinomycetes
- Order: Streptomycetales
- Family: Streptomycetaceae
- Genus: Streptomyces
- Species: S. geldanamycininus

Binomial name
- Streptomyces geldanamycininus Goodfellow et al. 2008

Type strain
- DSM 41894, IFO 14620, NBRC 14620, NRRL 3602, NRRL B-3602, UC 5208

Synonyms
- "Streptomyces hygroscopicus var. geldanus" Dietz 1970

Species of bacterium

Streptomyces geldanamycininus is a bacterium species from the genus of Streptomyces. Streptomyces geldanamycininus produces geldanamycin.

== See also ==
- List of Streptomyces species
