= Penicillium resedanum =

Scientific classification
- Kingdom: Fungi
- Division: Ascomycota
- Class: Eurotiomycetes
- Order: Eurotiales
- Family: Aspergillaceae
- Genus: Penicillium
- Species: P. resedanum

Binomial name
- Penicillium resedanum McLennan, E.I.; Ducker, S.C.; Thrower, L.B. 1954

Type strain
- A221, ATCC 22356, BCRC 32014, CBS 181.71, CBS 439.73, CBS 508.73, CCRC 32014, FRR 0578, FRR 1970, IFO 9584, IHEM 5843, IMI 062877, IMI 189585, IPO 1163, KCTC 6449, MUCL 31200, NBRC 9584, NRRL 578, NRRL A-5334, NRRL A-6283, QM 6966, WB 4079

Species of fungus

Penicillium resedanum is an anamorph species of fungus in the genus Penicillium which produces monorden.
