= AbuBakr Bahaj =

British engineer and academic

- Born: AbuBakr S. Bahaj
- Education: University of Southampton (PhD)
- Known for: Marine energy, Solar photovoltaics, Energy for development, Project Sign, Chief Scientific Adviser (Southampton)
- Title: Head of Energy and Climate Change Division, University of Southampton
- Awards: Science Council Top 100 Practising Scientists (2014)
- Scientific career
- Fields: Sustainable energy, Renewable energy, Civil engineering
- Workplaces: University of Southampton; Southampton City Council
- Website: energy.soton.ac.uk

AbuBakr Bahaj is an engineer and academic, who currently hold a role at the University of Southampton. He also served as the UK's first chief scientific adviser to a local council after his was appointed by Southampton City Council in 2012. Bahaj specialises in renewable energy engineering and is seen as an expert in the field.

== Career ==
As an emerging expert in the field of renewable energy, in 2008 he was invited to provide evidence to the House of Lords' The Economics of Renewable Energy - Economic Affairs Committee.

While working at the University of Southampton, the local council announced plans for a role of chief scientific adviser, the first of its kind in the United Kingdom for a council. Bahaj was announced as the first person to hold the role in August 2012.

In 2013, Bahaj was interviewed by The Conversation to discuss the best renewable options for remote locations away from traditional power grids.

His work in the field of tidal energy has led to him discussing the subject publicly at conferences and in the media. In Deutsche Welle, Bahaj discussed the current problems with scaling tidal and how irregular wave patterns (e.g. storm surges), made it difficult to harness power consistently on a large scale with today's technology.

In 2014, he was named by the Science Council as one of the UK’s 100 leading practicing scientists.

Bahaj was elected a Fellow of the Royal Academy of Engineering (FREng) in 2024.

== Research & publications ==
Bahaj's research in sustainable energy is published in over 300 articles, and referred to in journals and international conferences. In 2013, he founded the International Journal of Marine Energy (IJOME). A second journal followed in 2018, the International Marine Energy Journal (IMEJ). He currently serves as its Editor-in-Chief.
