= Luminespib =

Names
- Preferred IUPAC name 5-[2,4-Dihydroxy-5-(propan-2-yl)phenyl]-N-ethyl-4-{4-[(morpholin-4-yl)methyl]phenyl}-1,2-oxazole-3-carboxamide
- Other names NVP-AUY-922; AUY922; VER-52296

Identifiers
CAS Number	747412-49-3
3D model (JSmol)	Interactive image
ChEBI	CHEBI:83656
ChEMBL	ChEMBL252164
ChemSpider	21377936
DrugBank	DB11881
KEGG	D10646
PubChem CID	135539077
UNII	C6V1DAR5EB
CompTox Dashboard (EPA)	DTXSID001336117
- InChI: InChI=1S/C26H31N3O5/c1-4-27-26(32)24-23(18-7-5-17(6-8-18)15-29-9-11-33-12-10-29)25(34-28-24)20-13-19(16(2)3)21(30)14-22(20)31/h5-8,13-14,16,30-31H,4,9-12,15H2,1-3H3,(H,27,32) Key: NDAZATDQFDPQBD-UHFFFAOYSA-N; InChI=1S/C26H31N3O5/c1-4-27-26(32)24-23(18-7-5-17(6-8-18)15-29-9-11-33-12-10-29)25(34-28-24)20-13-19(16(2)3)21(30)14-22(20)31/h5-8,13-14,16,30-31H,4,9-12,15H2,1-3H3,(H,27,32)
- SMILES: CC(C)c1cc(c(O)cc1O)c2onc(C(=O)NCC)c2c3ccc(cc3)CN4CCOCC4

Properties
Chemical formula	C_{26}H_{31}N_{3}O_{5}
Molar mass	465.550 g·mol^{−1}
Appearance	Colorless solid
- Except where otherwise noted, data are given for materials in their standard state (at 25 °C [77 °F], 100 kPa). verify (what is ?) Infobox references

Luminespib (INN, previously known as NVP-AUY922) is an experimental drug candidate for the treatment of cancer. It was discovered through a collaboration between The Institute of Cancer Research and the pharmaceutical company Vernalis and licensed to Novartis. From 2011 to 2014 it was in Phase II clinical trials. Chemically it is a resorcinylic isoxazole amide

Luminespib is an inhibitor of heat shock protein 90 (Hsp90), which is a chaperone protein that plays a role in the modification of a variety of proteins that have been implicated in oncogenesis. Luminespib has shown promising activity in preclinical testing against several different tumor types.

A related compound, NVP-HSP990, was abandoned by Novartis in 2012 after it failed to show efficacy in an early clinical trial.

== See also ==
- Hsp90 inhibitors
