= Pimitespib =

Gastrointestinal drug

Clinical data
- Trade names: Jeselhy
- Other names: TAS 116

Legal status
- Legal status: Rx in Japan

Identifiers
- CAS Number: 1260533-36-5
- DrugBank: DB14876
- UNII: PLO044MUDZ
- KEGG: D11920

Chemical and physical data
- Formula: C_{25}H_{26}N_{8}O
- Molar mass: 454.538 g·mol^{−1}
- 3D model (JSmol): Interactive image
- SMILES: O=C(N)C1=CC=C(C(=C1)CC)N2N=C(C=3C2=NC=CC3N4C=NC(=C4)C=5C=NN(C5)C)C(C)C

Pimitespib (trade name Jeselhy) is a drug for the treatment of gastrointestinal stromal tumors. It was discovered and developed by Taiho Pharmaceutical Co. The mechanism of action of pimitespib involves inhibition of heat shock protein 90 (Hsp90).

In June 2022, it received approval in Japan for gastrointestinal stromal tumors that have progressed after chemotherapy.
