= Gliotoxin =

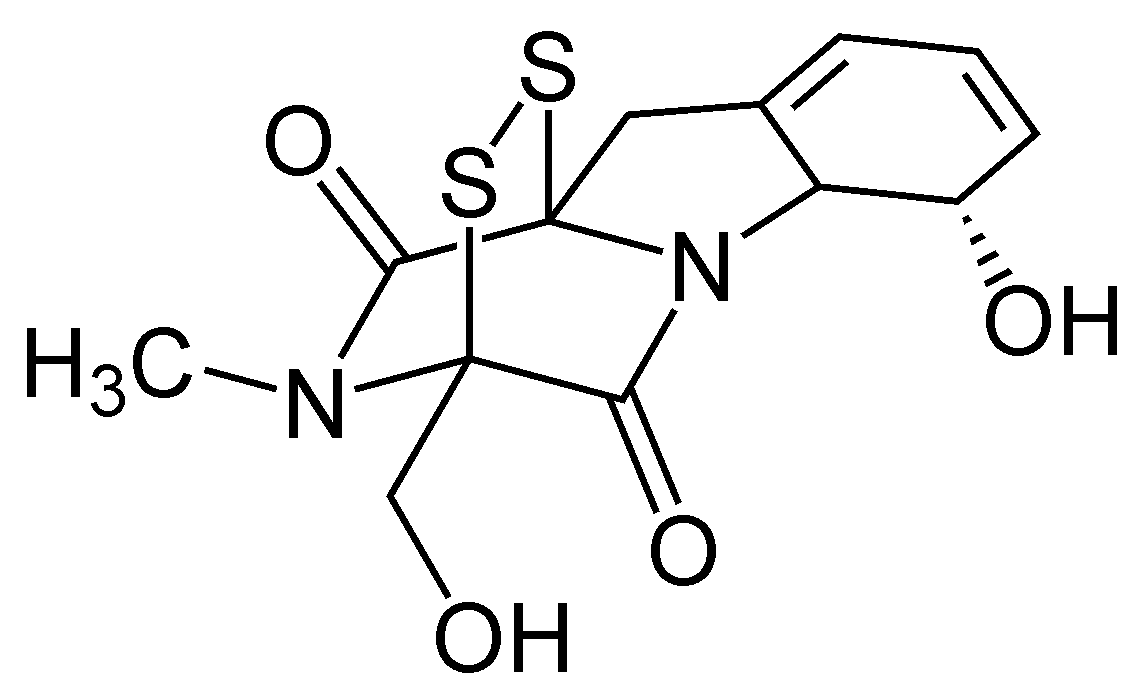

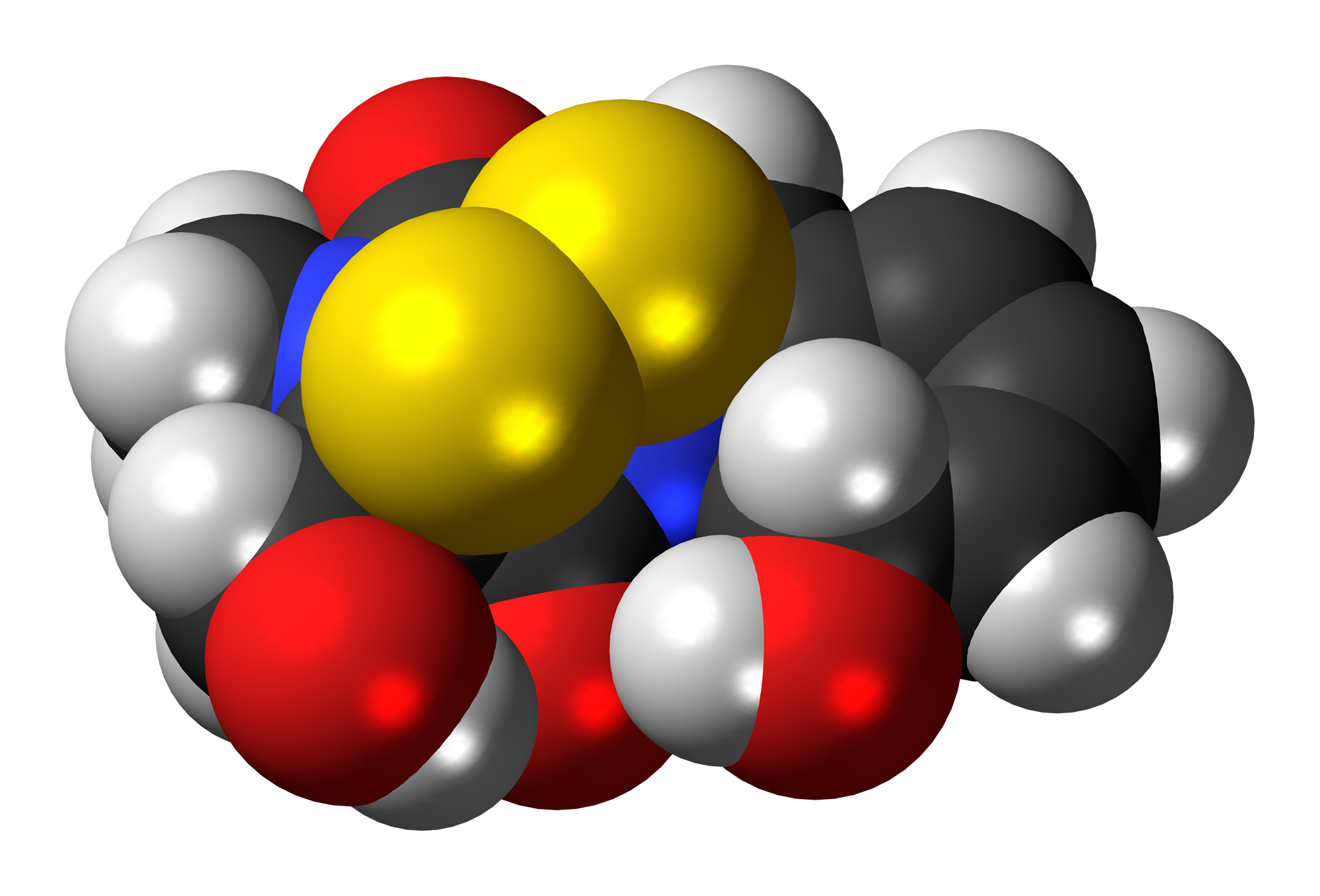

Names
- IUPAC name (3R,6S,10aR)-6-Hydroxy-3-(hydroxymethyl)-2-methyl-2,3,6,10-tetrahydro-5aH-3,10a-epidithiopyrazino[1,2-a]indole-1,4-dione

Identifiers
CAS Number	67-99-2
3D model (JSmol)	Interactive image
ChEMBL	ChEMBL331627; ChEMBL145588
ChemSpider	5988
ECHA InfoCard	100.163.992
PubChem CID	6223
UNII	5L648PH06K
CompTox Dashboard (EPA)	DTXSID60877179
- InChI: InChI=1S/C13H14N2O4S2/c1-14-10(18)12-5-7-3-2-4-8(17)9(7)15(12)11(19)13(14,6-16)21-20-12/h2-4,8-9,16-17H,5-6H2,1H3/t8-,9-,12+,13+/m0/s1 Key: FIVPIPIDMRVLAY-RBJBARPLSA-N; InChI=1S/C13H14N2O4S2/c1-14-10(18)12-5-7-3-2-4-8(17)9(7)15(12)11(19)13(14,6-16)21-20-12/h2-4,8-9,16-17H,5-6H2,1H3/t8-,9-,12+,13+/m0/s1 Key: FIVPIPIDMRVLAY-RBJBARPLBT; Key: FIVPIPIDMRVLAY-RBJBARPLSA-N
- SMILES: O=C1N([C@@]2(SS[C@@]14N(C2=O)[C@H]3C(=C\C=C/[C@@H]3O)/C4)CO)C

Properties
Chemical formula	C_{13}H_{14}N_{2}O_{4}S_{2}
Molar mass	326.39 g·mol^{−1}
Appearance	White to light yellow solid
Density	1.75 g/ml
Solubility in DMSO	soluble

Hazards
Safety data sheet (SDS)	MSDS from Fermentek
- Except where otherwise noted, data are given for materials in their standard state (at 25 °C [77 °F], 100 kPa). verify (what is ?) Infobox references

Gliotoxin is a sulfur-containing mycotoxin that belongs to a class of naturally occurring 2,5-diketopiperazines produced by several species of fungi, especially those of marine origin. It is the most prominent member of the epipolythiopiperazines, a large class of natural products featuring a diketopiperazine with di- or polysulfide linkage. These highly bioactive compounds have been the subject of numerous studies aimed at new therapeutics. Gliotoxin was originally isolated from Gliocladium fimbriatum, and was named accordingly. It is an epipolythiodioxopiperazine metabolite that is one of the most abundantly produced metabolites in human invasive Aspergillosis (IA).

== Occurrence ==
The compound is produced by human pathogens such as Aspergillus fumigatus, and also by species of Trichoderma and Penicillium. Gliotoxin has also been reported from yeasts of the genus Candida, but results from other studies have cast doubt on the production of this metabolite by Candida fungi. Gliotoxin is not produced by nonpathogenic A. fischeri although A.fischeri contains a gene cluster that is homologous to the gliotoxin gene cluster found in the pathogenic A. fumigatus. Gliotoxin contributes to the pathogenicity of opportunistic fungi by suppressing the immune system response of its host. Gliotoxin additionally possesses fungicidal and bacteriostatic properties, which indicates that it likely plays an important self defense role against bacteria and other fungi for the fungi that produce gliotoxin. Exposure of A. fumigatus to exogenous gliotoxin resulted in aberrant protein expression, especially in those strains that lacked the self-protection protein GliT. There is additional evidence for differential gliotoxin sensitivities amongst fungi including Aspergillus flavus, Fusarium graminearum, and Aspergillus oryzae.

=== Discovery ===
Gliotoxin was first described in 1936 by Weindling and Emerson as a metabolic product from the fungus Trichoderma lignorum. However, afterwards Weindling reported that the fungus had been misidentified based on the advice of C. Thom and M. Timonin, and that the compound instead was isolated from Gliocladium finbriatum. Contention remains on whether the fungus used by Weindling was G. finbriatum or a species of Trichoderma. The chemical structure of gliotoxin was resolved in 1958 by Bell et al. by treatment of gliotoxin on alkaline alumina. Bell and colleagues were able to determine through their structural analyses that the attachment of the disulfide bridge could not occur at any positions other than 3 and 11. This led to the elucidation that gliotoxin was an anhydropeptide related to the amino acids serine and phenylalanine. Additionally, they found that it was noteworthy that the α-carbon atoms of the cooperating α-thio-α-amino acids must have the same configuration.

== Mechanism of action ==
Gliotoxin is suspected to be an important virulence factor (aka pathogenicity factor) in Aspergillus fungus. Gliotoxin possesses immunosuppressive properties that may suppress and cause apoptosis in certain cells of the immune system, including neutrophils, eosinophils, granulocytes, macrophages, and thymocytes. Specifically, neutrophils exposed to gliotoxin release less reactive oxygen species (ROS) and complete fewer phagocytic activities. Gliotoxin is also believed to interfere with T-cell activation. Additionally, gliotoxin acts as an inhibitor of farnesyl transferase. It noncompetitively inhibits the chymotrypsin-like activity of the 20S proteasome.

In vivo gliotoxin displays anti-inflammatory activity. It was investigated as an antibiotic and antifungal in the 1940s and as an antiviral agent. Gliotoxin inactivates many different enzymes, including nuclear factor-κB (NF-κB), NADPH oxidase, and glutaredoxin. The inhibition of NF-κB leads prevents cytokine release and induction of the inflammatory response.

The immunosuppressive properties of gliotoxin are due to the disulfide bridge within its structure. Interactions occur between sulfur molecules that make up the disulfide bridge and thiol groups contained in cysteine residues. Gliotoxin acts by blocking thiol residues in the cell membrane. Gliotoxin also activates a member of the Bcl-2 family called Bak in order to mediate cell apoptosis. Activated Bak then causes the release of ROS, which form pores within the mitochondrial membrane. These pores allow the release of cytochrome C and AIF, which initiate apoptosis within the cell.

== Biosynthesis ==
In Aspergillus fumigatus, the enzymes needed for gliotoxin biosynthesis are encoded in 13 genes within the gli gene cluster. When this gene cluster is activated, these enzymes mediate the production of gliotoxin from serine and phenylalanine residues. The function of some genes contained within the gli gene cluster remain to be elucidated.

Enzymes Involved in Biosynthesis (in order of activity)

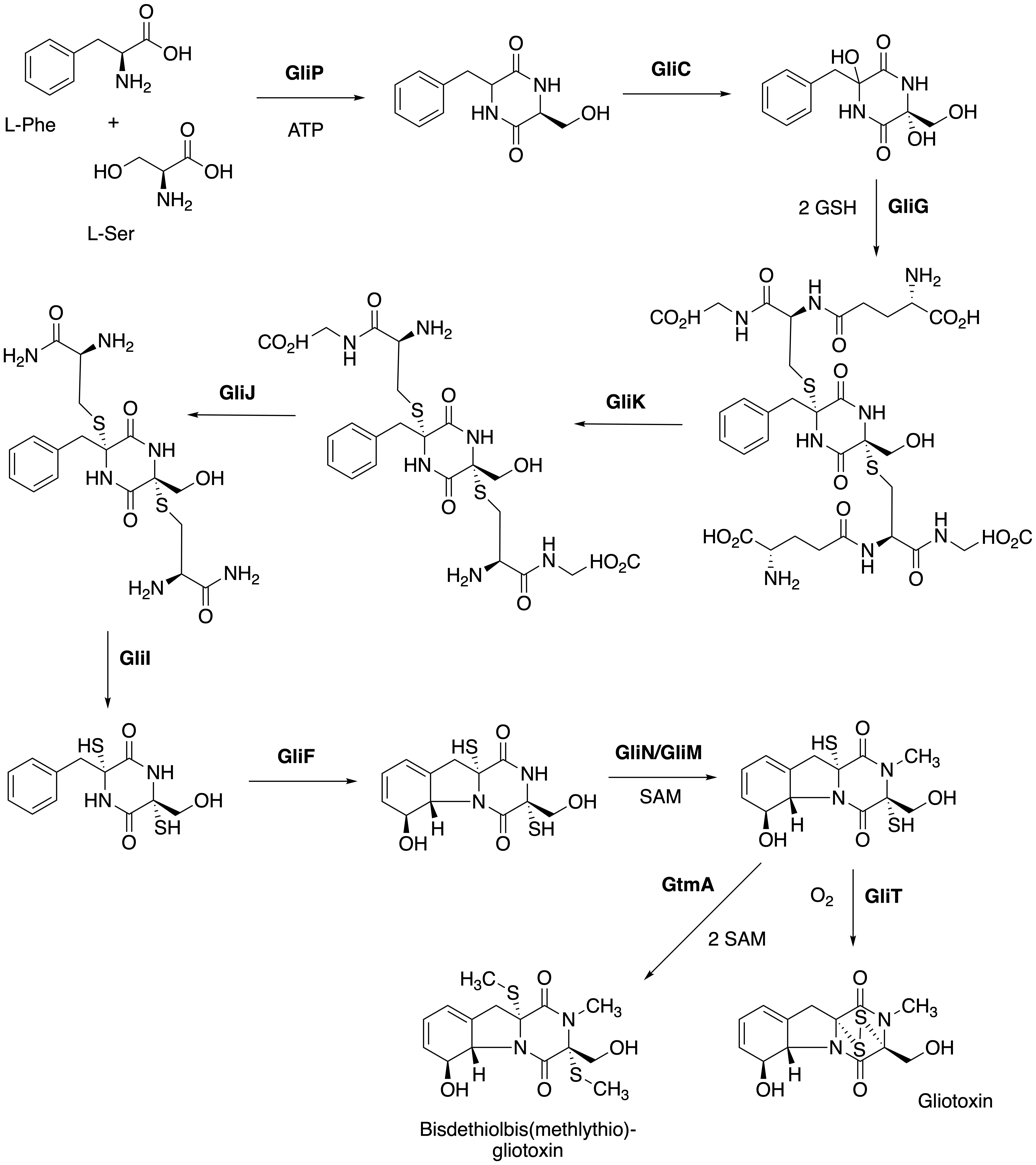
Biosynthetic pathway of gliotoxin Ye et al. (2021)

GliZ: transcription factor that regulates expression of gli gene cluster

GliP: non-ribosomal peptide synthetase that facilitates formation of cyclo-phenylalanyl-serine intermediate from serine and phenylalanine residues

GliC: cytochrome P450 monooxygenase that adds hydroxyl group to the alpha carbon of the phenylalanine residue in the cyclo-phenylalanyl-serine intermediate

GliG: glutathione S-transferase (GST) that adds two glutathione molecules forming a bis-glutathionylated intermediate

GliK: gamma-glutamyl transferase that removes gamma-glutamyl moieties from glutathione additions

GliJ: Cys-Gly carboxypeptidase that removes carboxyl moieties from glutathione additions

GliI: aminotransferase that removes amino moieties from glutathione additions

GliF: cytochrome P450 monooxygenase that adds hydroxyl group to the benzene residue and facilitates ring closure

GliN/GliM: N-methyltransferase/O-methyltransferase that adds a methyl group to nitrogen to form the dithiol gliotoxin intermediate utilizing s-adenosyl methionine (SAM) in the reaction

GliT: oxidoreductase thioredoxin that mediates closure of the disulfide-bridge

GliA: Major Facilitator Superfamily transporter that secretes gliotoxin across cell membrane

The exact roles of the enzymes GliC, GliF, GliM, and GliN and the steps in the biosynthetic pathway of these enzymes are still not completely understood in the biosynthesis of gliotoxin.

Regulation of Biosynthesis

Some gliotoxin molecules are not secreted by GliA and remain in the cell. This intracellular gliotoxin activates the transcription factor GliZ, facilitating gli gene cluster expression, and an enzyme called GtmA (S-adenosylmethionine (SAM)-dependent bis-thiomethyltransferase). GtmA acts as a negative regulator for gliotoxin biosynthesis by adding methyl groups to the two sulfur residues on the dithiol gliotoxin intermediate to form bisdethilobis(methylthio)-gliotoxin (BmGT). These additions prevent the formation of the disulfide bridge by GliT, inhibiting gliotoxin formation, while BmGT is significantly less toxic than gliotoxin.

It is thought that GliA, GtmA, and GliT provide mechanisms for self-protection against gliotoxin toxicity for the fungi that produce and excrete gliotoxin. GliA is a transporter involved in the secretion of gliotoxin, and it has been found that depletion of the GliA protein would result in cell death in A. fumigatus and significantly increase A. fumigatus sensitivity to gliotoxin. GtmA catalyzes the addition of methyl groups to the sulfur residues of dithiol gliotoxin to form nontoxic BmGT, which reduces the toxicity load on the fungi while also downregulating further expression of the gli cluster and attenuating gliotoxin biosynthesis. GliT is required for the formation of the disulfide bridge to create active gliotoxin, but it is also suggested that it plays a role in self-protection against gliotoxin toxicity. In A. fumigatus with the deletion of the GliT gene, there was found to be an accumulation of dithiol gliotoxin, which contributed to hypersensitivity to exogenous gliotoxin. These regulatory controls on the biosynthesis of gliotoxin are thought to provide mechanisms for novel strategies of gliotoxin toxicity prevention.

== Chemical synthesis ==
The first total synthesis of gliotoxin was achieved by Fukuyama and Kishi in 1976. Gliotoxin contains a total of four asymmetric centers along with two ring systems—hydrated benzene and epidithiapiperazinedione. Fukuyama and Kishi first synthesized the thioacetal 1 from glycine sarcosine anhydride via a six-step synthesis with an overall 30% yield. A Michael reaction of 4-carbo-tert-butoxybenzene oxide 2 in excess in a solvent of dimethyl sulfoxide (DMSO) containing Triton B at room temperature produced the alcohol 3 in 88% overall yield. It is expected that there would be a trans-opening of the epoxide ring for 2, so the resulting epimers would differ in the relative configuration of the thioacetal bridge and the alcoholic group depending on the orientation of compounds 1 and 2 in the transition state. It was theorized that the orientation of 1 and 2 that produced the alcohol 3 would be unfavorable in non-polar solvents. Thus, desired stereochemistry was assigned to the alcohol 3, and this compound was used in the further synthesis.

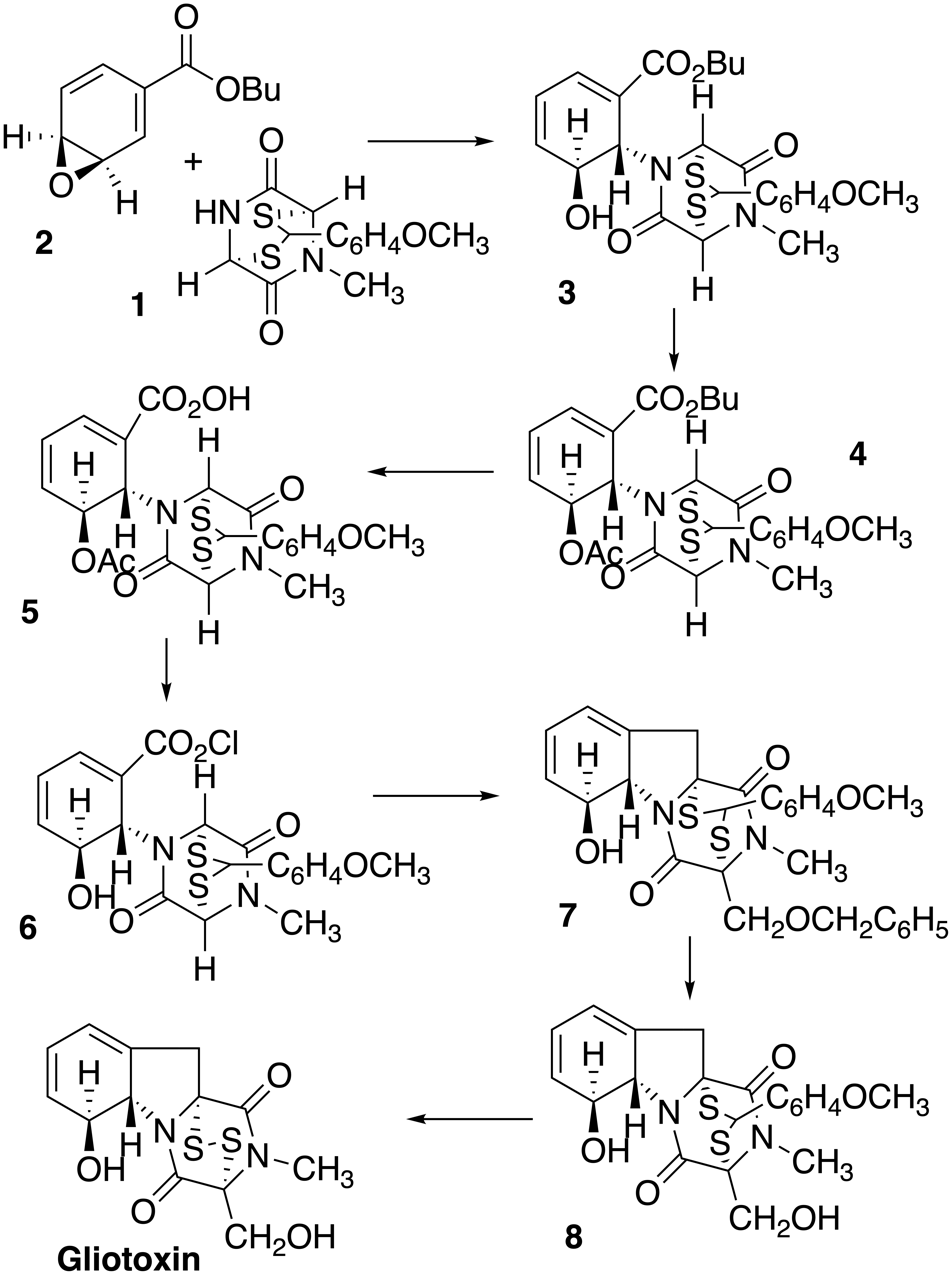
First total synthesis of gliotoxin Fukuyama & Kishi (1976)

The alcohol 3 was then converted into the acetate 4 via acetic anhydride-pyridine at room temperature with an overall yield of 90%. The acetate was then converted to the hydroxymethyl derivative 5 in three steps (1. TFA/room temperature; 2. ClCO_{2}Et/Et_{3}N-CH_{2}Cl_{2}/room temperature; 3. NaBH_{4}/CH_{3}OH-CH_{2}Cl_{2}/0 °C. Mesylation of 5 (MsCl/CH_{3}OH-Et_{3}N-CH_{2}Cl_{2}/0 °C), followed by lithium chloride treatment in DMF and hydrolysis (NaOCH_{3}/CH_{3}OH-CH_{2}Cl_{2}/room temperature) give the chloride 6 at a 95% overall yield. Adding phenyllithium slowly to a mixture of 6 and chloromethyl benzyl ether in excess in THF at 78 °C gave the benzylgliotoxin adduct 7 at 45% yield. Next, boron trichloride treatment of 7 in in methylene chloride at 0 °C yielded the gliotoxin anisaldehyde adduct 8 at 50% yield. Finally, acid oxidation of 8 followed by perchloric acid treatment in methylene chloride at room temperature yielded d,l-gliotoxin in a 65% yield. Spectroscopic analysis (NMR, ir, uv, MS) and TLC comparison showed that the synthetic substance was identical to natural gliotoxin.

At least a couple of alternative syntheses are known to be reported in the pendant literature.

== Exposure and health effects ==
=== Environmental exposure ===
Exposure to fungal species that secrete gliotoxin is common because airborne Aspergillus fungal spores are ubiquitous in many environments. Regular environmental exposure does not typically cause illness, but can cause serious infections in immunosuppressed individuals or those with chronic respiratory illnesses. Infection caused by Aspergillus fungus is called aspergillosis. There are many types of aspergillosis, but infections typically affect the lungs or the sinuses.

Gliotoxin is hypothesized to be an important virulence factor in Aspergillus fumigatus. Experiments have demonstrated that gliotoxin is isolated in the highest concentrations from Aspergillus fumigatus in comparison to other Aspergillus species. This species of fungi is the most common cause of aspergillosis in humans. Gliotoxin is also the only toxin that has been isolated from the sera of patients with invasive aspergillosis. These results suggest a link between gliotoxin secretion and fungal pathogenicity.

While not enough data exists to definitively tie chronic gliotoxin exposure to the development of cancer, chronic exposure to other immunosuppressive agents has been linked to the development of lymphomas and mammary tumors. Individuals taking immunosuppressive medications or with previous or current exposure to chemotherapy radiation are at higher risk for the development of these tumors.

=== Clinical exposure ===
Gliotoxin is toxic if swallowed or inhaled, and can cause skin and eye irritation if exposure occurs to these areas. The oral LD_{50} of gliotoxin is 67 mg/kg. Acute symptoms of gliotoxin start rapidly after ingestion.

=== Strategies for toxicity prevention ===
Understanding the mechanisms behind the toxicity of gliotoxin can open new possibilities for the use of gliotoxin therapeutically or as a diagnostic test for some conditions. One potential strategy that has been explored to reduce the toxicity of the fungi that produce gliotoxin is to target the gli gene cluster that controls the expression of gliotoxin protein. The disulfide bridge of gliotoxin is crucial to its toxicity, so it is theorized that the tailoring of enzymes to prevent the disulfide bridge closure by interfering with GliT or by catalyzing another reaction to block the sulfur residues may be beneficial in reducing the toxicity of those fungi. Another potential strategy is the targeting of the transcriptional activator GliZ, as deletion of the GliZ resulted in abrogated gliotoxin biosynthesis. This leads to the possible targeting of GliZ itself rather than any gene-based methodology to prevent it from binding to the gli gene cluster and activate transcription of the genes required for gliotoxin biosynthesis. One possible strategy for disrupting the regulation of gliotoxin transport is depleting the amount of GipA in the cell. GipA is a transcriptional regulator for the expression of the GliA transporter protein, which is required for gliotoxin secretion. These biosynthetic strategies for reducing the toxicity of pathogenic fungal strains that produce gliotoxin are still in their early stages of exploration but could provide novel methodologies for the adoption of therapeutic uses for gliotoxin.

=== Possible uses ===
While gliotoxin exposure at high concentrations shows cytotoxic effects via a multitude of different pathways, low-dose gliotoxin has been shown to have beneficial biological functions. Low-dose gliotoxin can exert antioxidant activities in the presence of the thioredoxin redox system that can counter the release of ROS in cells as a result of the electron transport chain (ETC) during cellular respiration. Moderate doses of gliotoxin have also been found to exhibit an anti-inflammatory effect in vivo due to the suppression of NF-κB activity by gliotoxin. Doses of gliotoxin less than 40 nM can also activate latent HIV-1 gene expression, serving as a diagnostic of HIV infection. Gliotoxin can activate HIV-1 expression by targeting (LARP7), which results in the release of active P-TEFb and the positive regulation of transcription of HIV proteins. Treatment of 20 nM gliotoxin reversed HIV-1 latency without interfering in the activation of CD4^{+} or CD8+ T-cells that are involved in the elimination of HIV-infected cells. While research on this possible gliotoxin use is in early stages, this provides a possible future direction for HIV diagnosis and treatment.
