= Streptomyces narbonensis =

Scientific classification
- Domain: Bacteria
- Kingdom: Bacillati
- Phylum: Actinomycetota
- Class: Actinomycetes
- Order: Streptomycetales
- Family: Streptomycetaceae
- Genus: Streptomyces
- Species: S. narbonensis

Binomial name
- Streptomyces narbonensis Corbaz et al. 1955

Type strain
- ATCC 19790, BCRC 13651, CBS 310.55, CBS 542.68, CCM 4151, CCRC 13651, CGMCC 4.1737, DSM 40016, ETH 7346, IFO 12801, ISP 5016, JCM 4147, JCM 4596, LMG 20043, NBRC 12801, NRRL B-1680, NRRL-ISP 5016, ptcc1137, RIA 1069, RIA 529, UNIQEM 176, VKM Ac-1891

Synonyms
- Streptomyces narboensis

Species of bacterium

Streptomyces narbonensis is a bacterium species from the genus of Streptomyces which has been isolated from soil in France. Streptomyces narbonensis produces narbomycin and josamycin.

== See also ==
- List of Streptomyces species
