= Josamycin =

Chemical compound

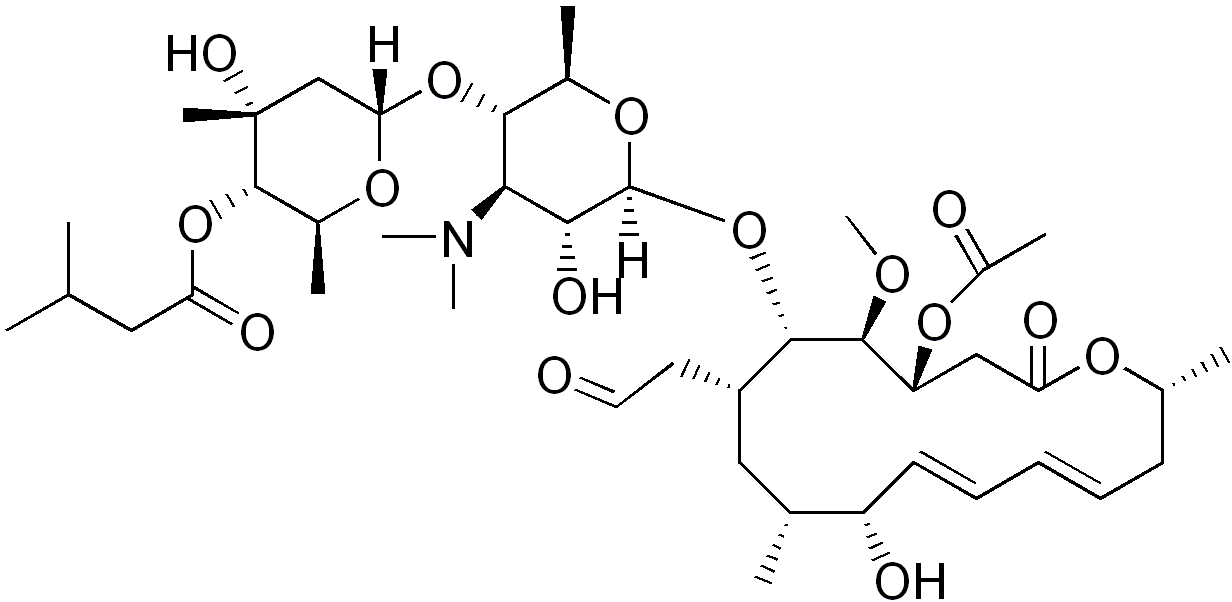

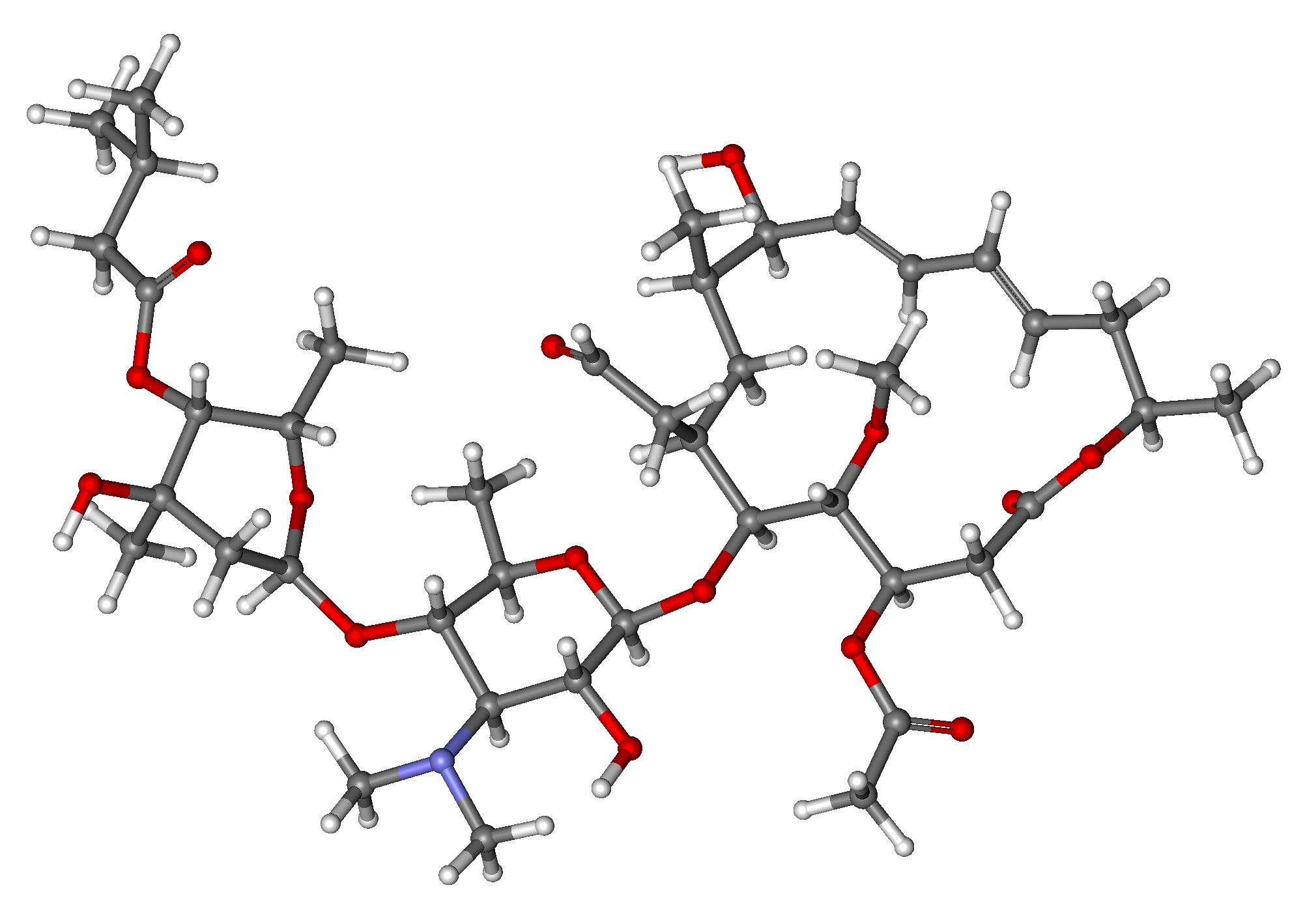

Clinical data
- AHFS/Drugs.com: International Drug Names
- ATC code: J01FA07 (WHO)

Identifiers
- IUPAC name: (2S,3S,4R,6S)-6-{[(2R,3S,4R,5R,6S)-6-{[(4R,5S,6S,7R,9R,10R,11E,13E,16R)-4-Acetoxy-10-hydroxy-5-methoxy-9,16-dimethyl-2-oxo-7-(2-oxoethyl)oxacyclohexadeca-11,13-dien-6-yl]oxy}-4-(dimethylamino)-5-hydro xy-2-methyltetrahydro-2H-pyran-3-yl]oxy}-4-hydroxy-2,4-dimethyltetrahydro-2H-pyran-3-yl 3-methylbutanoate
- CAS Number: 16846-24-5
- PubChem CID: 5282165
- DrugBank: DB01321
- ChemSpider: 4445361
- UNII: HV13HFS217
- KEGG: D01235
- ChEBI: CHEBI:31739
- ChEMBL: ChEMBL224436
- CompTox Dashboard (EPA): DTXSID8023183
- ECHA InfoCard: 100.037.140

Chemical and physical data
- Formula: C_{42}H_{69}NO_{15}
- Molar mass: 828.006 g·mol^{−1}
- 3D model (JSmol): Interactive image
- SMILES: C[C@@H]1C/C=C/C=C/[C@@H]([C@@H](C[C@@H]([C@@H]([C@H]([C@@H](CC(=O)O1)OC(=O)C)OC)O[C@H]2[C@@H]([C@H]([C@@H]([C@H](O2)C)O[C@H]3C[C@@]([C@H]([C@@H](O3)C)OC(=O)CC(C)C)(C)O)N(C)C)O)CC=O)C)O
- InChI: InChI=1S/C42H69NO15/c1-23(2)19-32(47)56-40-27(6)53-34(22-42(40,8)50)57-37-26(5)54-41(36(49)35(37)43(9)10)58-38-29(17-18-44)20-24(3)30(46)16-14-12-13-15-25(4)52-33(48)21-31(39(38)51-11)55-28(7)45/h12-14,16,18,23-27,29-31,34-41,46,49-50H,15,17,19-22H2,1-11H3/b13-12+,16-14+/t24-,25-,26-,27+,29+,30+,31-,34+,35-,36-,37-,38+,39+,40+,41+,42-/m1/s1; Key:XJSFLOJWULLJQS-NGVXBBESSA-N

Josamycin is a macrolide antibiotic. It was isolated by Hamao Umezawa and his colleagues from strains of Streptomyces narbonensis var. josamyceticus var. nova in 1964.

It is currently sold in various countries.Brand examples are:

- Europe: Josalid, Josacine, Iosalide, Josamina
- Russia: Wilprafen (Вильпрафен)
- Japan: Josamy

== Adverse effects ==
There has been a case report of edema of the feet.
