= Cohort =

Cohort or cohortes means ‘’’A definite group of people’’’, derived from the assimilated form of com (with) plus chorus (act together) from PIE verb *gher- (to grasp, to enclose). It may refer to:

== Specific cohort types ==
=== Sociological ===
- Cohort (military unit), the basic tactical unit of a Roman legion
- Cohort (educational group), a group of students working together through the same academic curriculum

=== Scientific ===
- Cohort (statistics), a group of subjects with a common defining characteristic, for example age group
- Cohort (floating point), a set of different encodings of the same numerical value
- Cohort (taxonomy), in biology, one of the taxonomic ranks
- Cohort study, a form of longitudinal study used in medicine and social science
- Cohort analysis, a subset of behavioral analytics that takes the data from a given data set
- Generational cohort, an aggregation of individuals who experience the same event within the same time interval

=== Gaming ===
- Cohort Studios, a video game development company
- "Cohort", a disc golf putter by Infinite Discs

== Cohortes (Roman) ==
- Cohortes urbanae, the riot police of Ancient Rome, also pressed into use as a military unit
- Cohortes vigilum, the firefighters and police of Ancient Rome
