= Radicicol =

Names
- Preferred IUPAC name (1aR,2E,4E,14R,15aR)-8-Chloro-9,11-dihydroxy-14-methyl-1a,14,15,15a-tetrahydro-6H-oxireno[e][2]benzoxacyclotetradecine-6,12(7H)-dione

Identifiers
CAS Number	12772-57-5
3D model (JSmol)	Interactive image
ChEBI	CHEBI:556075
ChEMBL	ChEMBL453386
ChemSpider	20137057
ECHA InfoCard	100.170.695
PubChem CID	6323491
UNII	I60EH8GECX
CompTox Dashboard (EPA)	DTXSID2042692
- InChI: InChI=1S/C18H17ClO6/c1-9-6-15-14(25-15)5-3-2-4-10(20)7-11-16(18(23)24-9)12(21)8-13(22)17(11)19/h2-5,8-9,14-15,21-22H,6-7H2,1H3/b4-2+,5-3-/t9-,14-,15-/m1/s1 Key: WYZWZEOGROVVHK-GTMNPGAYSA-N; InChI=1/C18H17ClO6/c1-9-6-15-14(25-15)5-3-2-4-10(20)7-11-16(18(23)24-9)12(21)8-13(22)17(11)19/h2-5,8-9,14-15,21-22H,6-7H2,1H3/b4-2+,5-3-/t9-,14-,15-/m1/s1 Key: WYZWZEOGROVVHK-GTMNPGAYBX
- SMILES: C[C@@H]1C[C@@H]2[C@H](O2)/C=C\C=C\C(=O)Cc3c(c(cc(c3Cl)O)O)C(=O)O1

Properties
Chemical formula	C_{18}H_{17}ClO_{6}
Molar mass	364.78 g·mol^{−1}
- Except where otherwise noted, data are given for materials in their standard state (at 25 °C [77 °F], 100 kPa). verify (what is ?) Infobox references

Radicicol, also known as monorden, is a natural product that binds to Hsp90 (Heat Shock Protein 90) and alters its function. HSP90 client proteins play important roles in the regulation of the cell cycle, cell growth, cell survival, apoptosis, angiogenesis and oncogenesis.

== Biosynthesis ==
Biosynthesis of radicicol has been best studied in Pochonia chlamydosporia, in which the majority of the core structure is produced in vivo through iterative type I polyketide synthases. This structure produced is the earliest intermediate in the radicicol biosynthesis, monocillin II. This intermediate is transformed to radicicol through halogenation and epoxide formation performed by RadH and RadP respectively. These enzymes are coded by the genes Rdc2 and Rdc4 in the pathway, and removing either of these results in a product that has the monocillin II core, but does not have either the epoxide or halogen added.

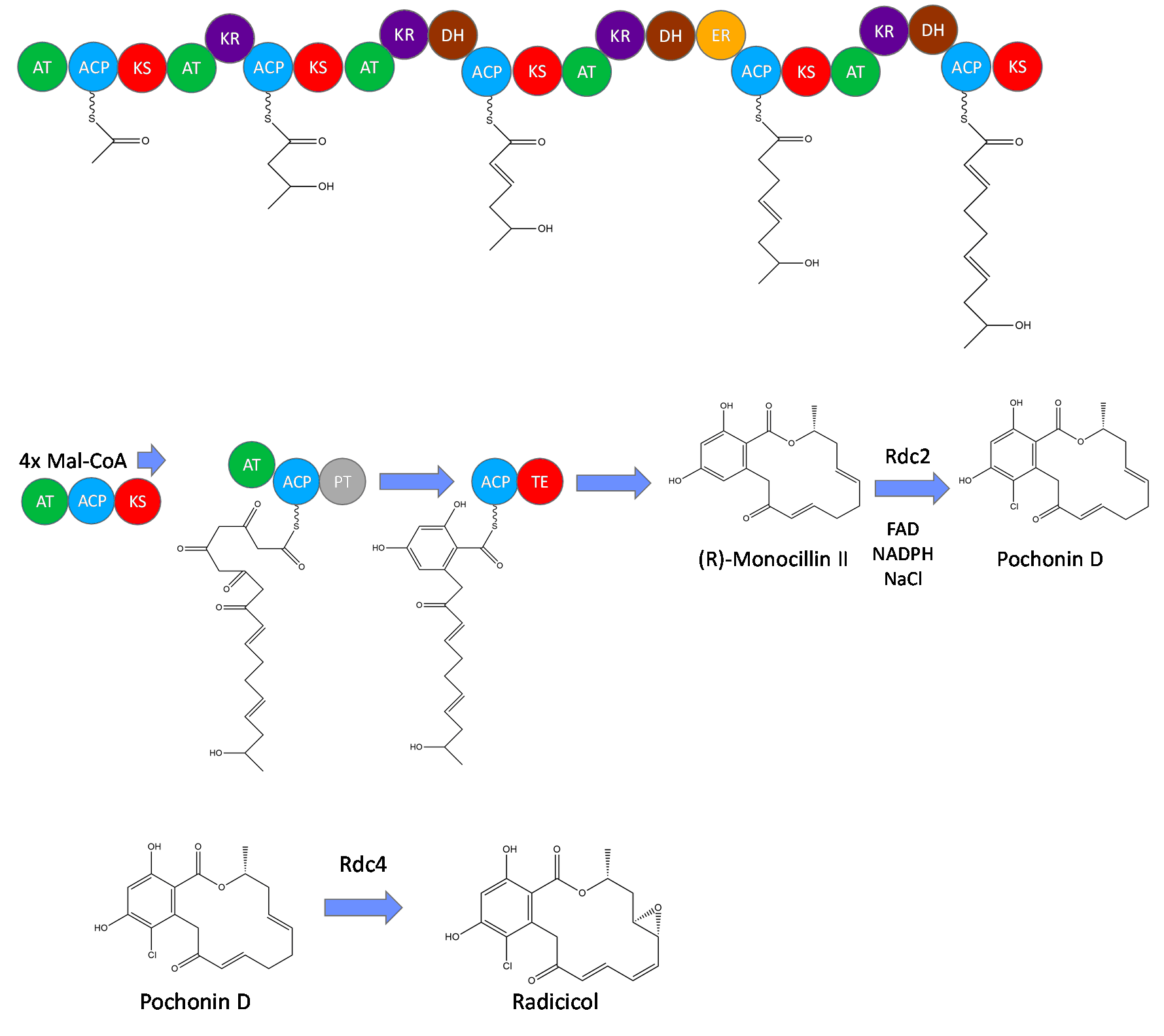
Proposed biosynthetic pathway of Radicicol.

== See also ==
- Geldanamycin
