= Tentoxin =

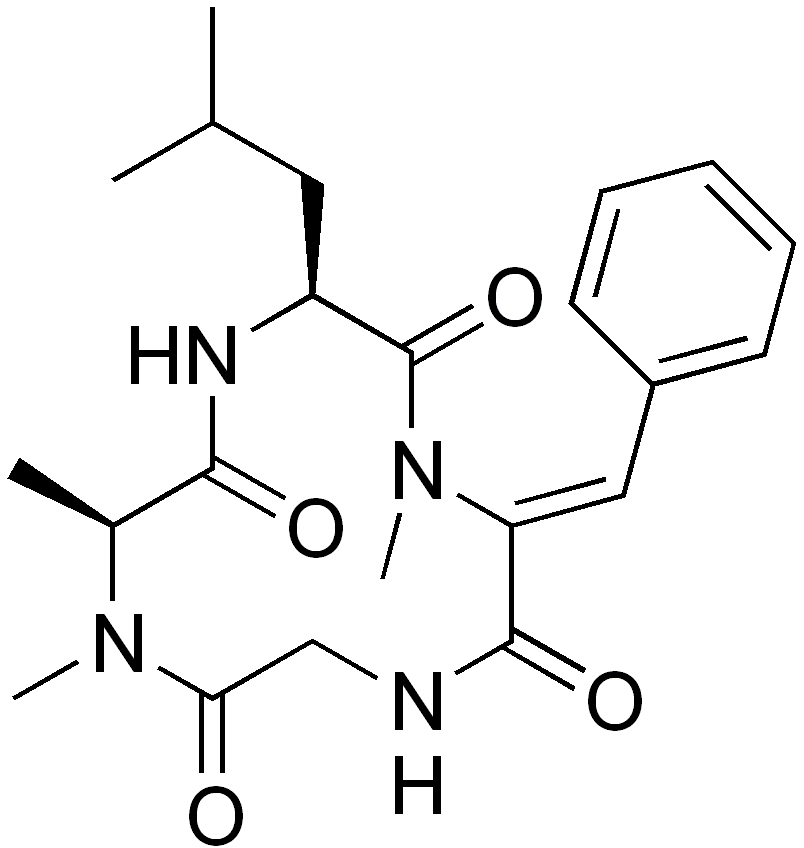
- Chemical structure of tentoxin

Names
- IUPAC name Cyclo(N-methyl-L-alanyl-L-leucyl-alpha,beta-didehydro-N-methylphenylalanylglycyl)

Identifiers
CAS Number	28540-82-1
3D model (JSmol)	Interactive image
ChemSpider	4444584
PubChem CID	5281143
UNII	FW4EQ02E0Z
CompTox Dashboard (EPA)	DTXSID70893264
- InChI: InChI=1S/C22H30N4O4/c1-14(2)11-17-22(30)26(5)18(12-16-9-7-6-8-10-16)21(29)23-13-19(27)25(4)15(3)20(28)24-17/h6-10,12,14-15,17H,11,13H2,1-5H3,(H,23,29)(H,24,28)/b18-12-/t15-,17-/m0/s1 Key: SIIRBDOFKDACOK-LFXZBHHUSA-N; InChI=1/C22H30N4O4/c1-14(2)11-17-22(30)26(5)18(12-16-9-7-6-8-10-16)21(29)23-13-19(27)25(4)15(3)20(28)24-17/h6-10,12,14-15,17H,11,13H2,1-5H3,(H,23,29)(H,24,28)/b18-12-/t15-,17-/m0/s1 Key: SIIRBDOFKDACOK-LFXZBHHUBW
- SMILES: O=C1N[C@H](C(=O)N(/C(C(=O)NCC(=O)N(C)[C@H]1C)=C\c2ccccc2)C)CC(C)C

Properties
Chemical formula	C_{22}H_{30}N_{4}O_{4}
Molar mass	414.498 g/mol
Melting point	172 to 175 °C (342 to 347 °F; 445 to 448 K)
- Except where otherwise noted, data are given for materials in their standard state (at 25 °C [77 °F], 100 kPa). verify (what is ?) Infobox references

Tentoxin is a natural cyclic tetrapeptide produced by phytopathogenic fungus Alternaria alternata. It selectively induces chlorosis in several germinating seedling plants. Therefore, tentoxin may be used as a potential natural herbicide, and is a lactam.

Tentoxin was first isolated from Alternaria alternata (syn. tenuis) and characterized by George Templeton et al. in 1967.

Tentoxin has also been used in recent research to eliminate the polyphenol oxidase (PPO) activity from seedlings of higher plants.
