= 17-Dimethylaminoethylamino-17-demethoxygeldanamycin =

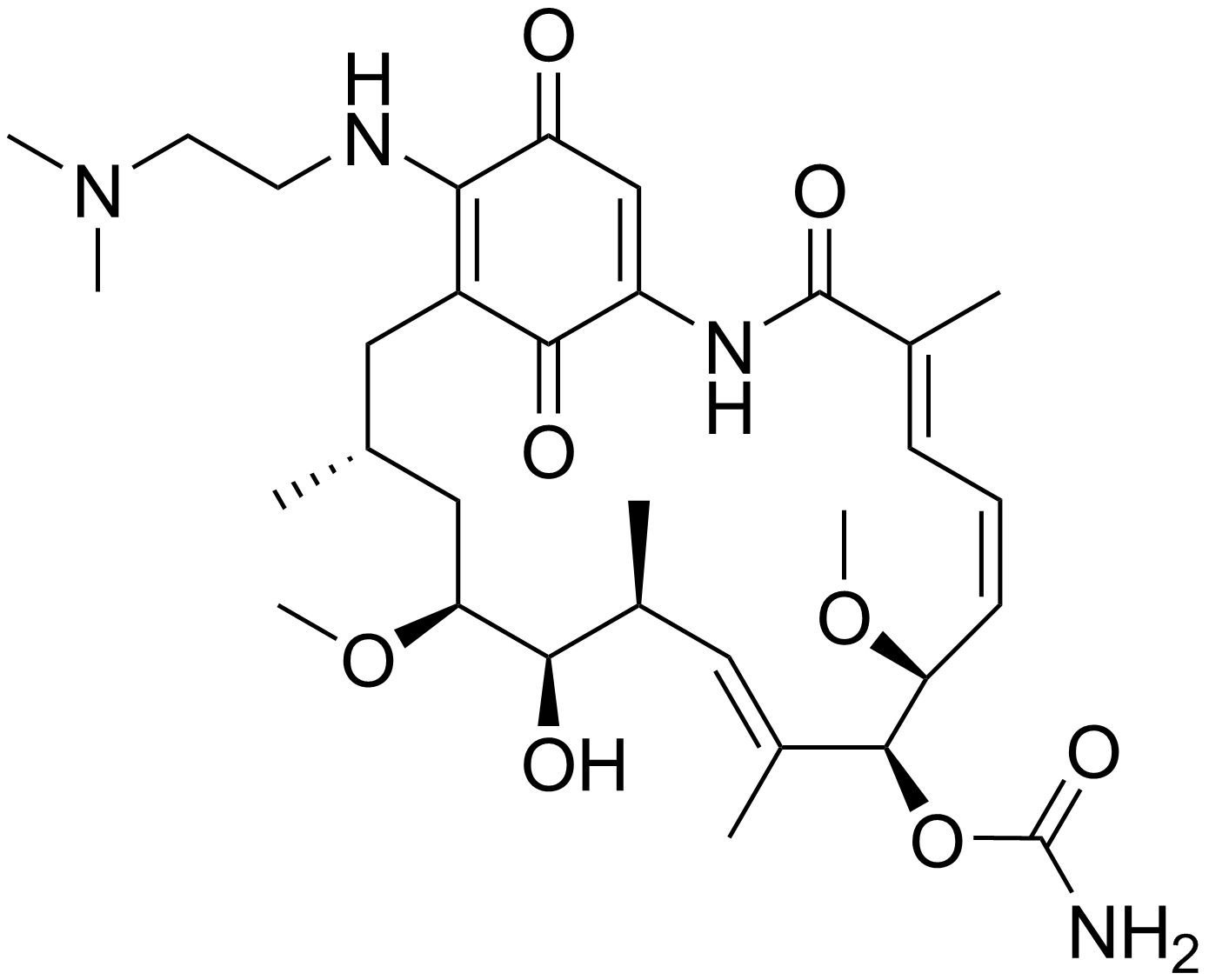

Names
- Preferred IUPAC name (4E,6Z,8S,9S,10E,12S,13R,14S,16R)-19-{[(Dimethylamino)ethyl]amino}-13-hydroxy-8,14-dimethoxy-4,10,12,16-tetramethyl-3,20,22-trioxo-2-azabicyclo[16.3.1]docosa-1(21),4,6,10,18-pentaen-9-yl carbamate
- Other names 17-DMAG; Alvespimycin

Identifiers
CAS Number	467214-20-6
3D model (JSmol)	Interactive image; Interactive image
ChEBI	CHEBI:65324
ChEMBL	ChEMBL383824
ChemSpider	16744073
PubChem CID	5288674
UNII	001L2FE0M3
CompTox Dashboard (EPA)	DTXSID00963646
- InChI: InChI=1S/C32H48N4O8/c1-18-14-22-27(34-12-13-36(5)6)24(37)17-23(29(22)39)35-31(40)19(2)10-9-11-25(42-7)30(44-32(33)41)21(4)16-20(3)28(38)26(15-18)43-8/h9-11,16-18,20,25-26,28,30,34,38H,12-15H2,1-8H3,(H2,33,41)(H,35,40)/b11-9-,19-10+,21-16+/t18-,20+,25+,26+,28-,30+/m1/s1 Key: KUFRQPKVAWMTJO-LMZWQJSESA-N; InChI=1/C32H48N4O8/c1-18-14-22-27(34-12-13-36(5)6)24(37)17-23(29(22)39)35-31(40)19(2)10-9-11-25(42-7)30(44-32(33)41)21(4)16-20(3)28(38)26(15-18)43-8/h9-11,16-18,20,25-26,28,30,34,38H,12-15H2,1-8H3,(H2,33,41)(H,35,40)/b11-9-,19-10+,21-16+/t18-,20+,25+,26+,28-,30+/m1/s1 Key: KUFRQPKVAWMTJO-LMZWQJSEBL
- SMILES: C[C@H]1C[C@@H]([C@@H]([C@H](/C=C(/[C@@H]([C@H](/C=C\C=C(\C(=O)NC2=CC(=O)C(=C(C1)C2=O)NCCN(C)C)/C)OC)OC(=O)N)\C)C)O)OC; C[C@H]1C[C@@H]([C@@H]([C@H](/C=C(/[C@@H]([C@H](/C=C\C=C(\C(=O)NC2=CC(=O)C(=C(C1)C2=O)NCCN(C)C)/C)OC)OC(=O)N)\C)C)O)OC

Properties
Chemical formula	C_{32}H_{48}N_{4}O_{8}
Molar mass	616.756 g·mol^{−1}
- Except where otherwise noted, data are given for materials in their standard state (at 25 °C [77 °F], 100 kPa). verify (what is ?) Infobox references

17-Dimethylaminoethylamino-17-demethoxygeldanamycin (17-DMAG) is a chemical compound which is a semi-synthetic derivative of the antibiotic geldanamycin. It is being studied for the possibility of treating cancer.
