= Office of the Chief Scientist =

Office of the Chief Scientist may refer to:

- Office of the Chief Scientist (Australia)
- Office of the Chief Scientist of the Israeli Ministry of Economy, a defunct government department succeeded by the Israel Innovation Authority
- Chief Scientist Office, Scotland

Chief Scientist may refer to:

- Chief scientific officer, sometimes referred to as chief scientist
  - Chief Scientific Officer (England)
- Chief technology officer, sometimes referred to as chief scientist
  - Chief Technology Officer of the United States
- The Chief Scientist, in the Office of the Chief Scientist (Australia)
- Chief Scientist of South Australia
- Chief Scientist of Western Australia
- Chief Scientist of the U.S. Air Force
- NASA Chief Scientist, a position in NASA

== See also ==
- Science advice
- Chief Scientific Adviser (disambiguation)
- Chief scientific officer
