= Chief Scientific Adviser =

Chief Scientific Adviser may refer to:

- Chief Science Advisor (Canada)
- Chief Scientific Adviser to the Ministry of Defence, United Kingdom
- Government Chief Scientific Adviser (United Kingdom)
- Office of the Chief Scientist (Australia)
- Government Chief Scientific Adviser (Ireland)
- Principal Scientific Adviser to the Government of India
- Science Advisor to the President, of the United States
- Scientific Advice Mechanism § Group of Chief Scientific Advisors, for the European Commission

== See also ==
- Science advice
- Office of the Chief Scientist (disambiguation)
