= Hamao Umezawa =

Japanese microbiologist

Hamao Umezawa (梅沢 浜夫, Umezawa Hamao, October 1, 1914 – December 25, 1986) was a Japanese scientist who discovered several antimicrobial agents and enzyme inhibitors.

Umezawa was born in Obama City, Fukui Prefecture, as the second son in a family of seven children. After graduating from Musashi Junior and Senior High School, he entered the University of Tokyo Graduate School of Medicine in 1933, and completed his medical degree in 1937. After serving in the Japanese army during World War II, Umezawa did work on tuberculosis which led to his discovery, in 1955, of the aminoglycoside antibiotic kanamycin. By this stage Umezawa was heading the Institute of Microbial Chemistry in Tokyo where his main focus was antimicrobial agents manufactured through fermentation processes. In 1963, he discovered the anticancer drug bleomycin, and in 1965 he discovered kasugamycin, a compound useful in combating rice molds.

His elder brother, Sumio Umezawa, was a chemist who had sometimes assisted in his work. He was married to Mieko Ishizaki on December 2, 1944; they had two sons.

Umezawa died of pneumonia on December 25, 1986. The Hamao Umezawa Memorial Museum in Setagaya, Tokyo was named in his honor.

== Awards ==
- Asahi Prize 1958
- Paul Ehrlich and Ludwig Darmstaedter Prize 1980
