= Tanespimycin =

Names
- IUPAC name [(3S,5S,6R,7S,8E,10R,11S,12E,14E)-21-(allylamino)-6-hydroxy-5,11-dimethoxy-3,7,9,15-tetramethyl-16,20,22-trioxo-17-azabicyclo[16.3.1]docosa-8,12,14,18,21-pentaen-10-yl] carbamate
- Other names 17-N-Allylamino-17-demethoxygeldanamycin; 17-AAG

Identifiers
CAS Number	75747-14-7
3D model (JSmol)	Interactive image; Interactive image
ChEMBL	ChEMBL109480
ChemSpider	21106220
IUPHAR/BPS	7751
PubChem CID	6440175
UNII	4GY0AVT3L4
CompTox Dashboard (EPA)	DTXSID5046352
- InChI: InChI=1S/C31H43N3O8/c1-8-12-33-26-21-13-17(2)14-25(41-7)27(36)19(4)15-20(5)29(42-31(32)39)24(40-6)11-9-10-18(3)30(38)34-22(28(21)37)16-23(26)35/h8-11,15-17,19,24-25,27,29,33,36H,1,12-14H2,2-7H3,(H2,32,39)(H,34,38)/b11-9-,18-10+,20-15+/t17-,19+,24+,25+,27-,29+/m1/s1 Key: AYUNIORJHRXIBJ-TXHRRWQRSA-N; InChI=1/C31H43N3O8/c1-8-12-33-26-21-13-17(2)14-25(41-7)27(36)19(4)15-20(5)29(42-31(32)39)24(40-6)11-9-10-18(3)30(38)34-22(28(21)37)16-23(26)35/h8-11,15-17,19,24-25,27,29,33,36H,1,12-14H2,2-7H3,(H2,32,39)(H,34,38)/b11-9-,18-10+,20-15+/t17-,19+,24+,25+,27-,29+/m1/s1 Key: AYUNIORJHRXIBJ-TXHRRWQRBY
- SMILES: NC(=O)O[C@H]1C(/C)=C/[C@H](C)[C@@H](O)[C@@H](OC)C[C@H](C)C\C2=C(/NCC=C)C(=O)\C=C(\NC(=O)C(\C)=C\C=C/[C@@H]1OC)C2=O; C[C@H]1C[C@@H]([C@@H]([C@H](/C=C(/[C@@H]([C@H](/C=C\C=C(\C(=O)NC2=CC(=O)C(=C(C1)C2=O)NCC=C)/C)OC)OC(=O)N)\C)C)O)OC

Properties
Chemical formula	C_{31}H_{43}N_{3}O_{8}
Molar mass	585.698 g·mol^{−1}
- Except where otherwise noted, data are given for materials in their standard state (at 25 °C [77 °F], 100 kPa). verify (what is ?) Infobox references

Tanespimycin (17-N-allylamino-17-demethoxygeldanamycin, 17-AAG) is a derivative of the antibiotic geldanamycin that is being studied in the treatment of cancer, specifically in younger patients with certain types of leukemia or solid tumors, especially kidney tumors.

It works by inhibiting Hsp90, which is expressed in those tumors.

It belongs to the family of drugs called antitumor antibiotics.

== Clinical trials ==
Bristol-Myers Squibb conducted Phase 1 and Phase 2 clinical trials. However, in 2010 the company halted development of tanespimycin, during late-stage clinical trials as a potential treatment for multiple myeloma. While no definitive explanation was given, it has been suggested that Bristol-Myers Squibb halted development over concerns of the financial feasibility of tanespimycin development given the 2014 expiry of the patent on this compound, and the relative expense of manufacture.
