= Thiolutin =

Chemical compound

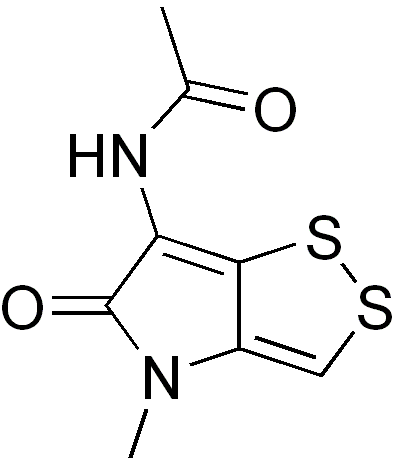

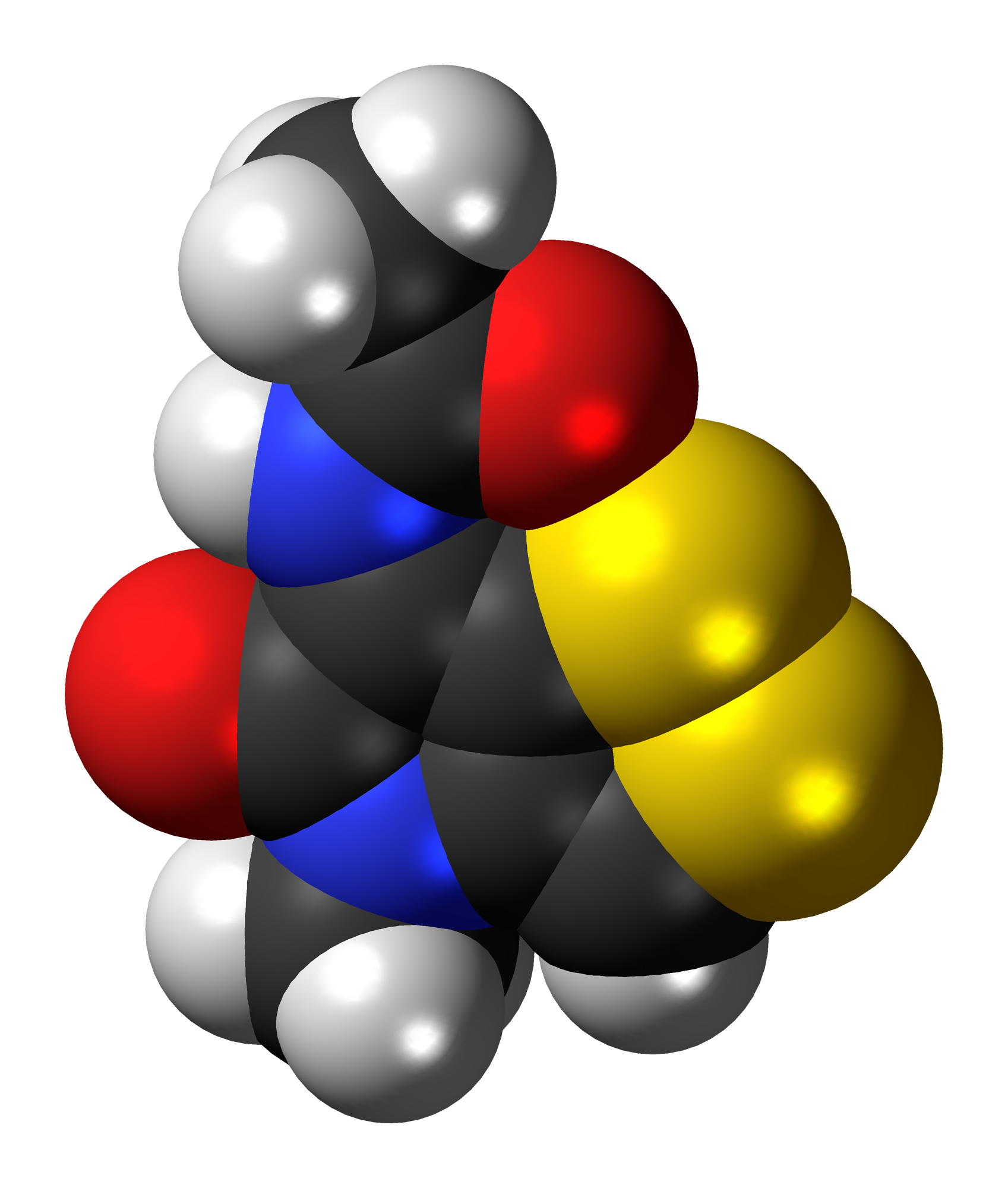

Clinical data
- Other names: N-(8-methyl-7-oxo-3,4-dithia-8-azabicyclo[3.3.0]octa-1,5-dien-6-yl)acetamide, farcinicin, propiopyvothine, acetopyrrothine
- ATC code: none

Identifiers
- IUPAC name: N-(4-methyl-5-oxo-4,5-dihydro[1,2]dithiolo[4,3-b]pyrrol-6-yl)acetamide
- CAS Number: 87-11-6
- PubChem CID: 6870
- ChemSpider: 6608
- UNII: 02C005Q20B
- ChEBI: CHEBI:156450
- ChEMBL: ChEMBL507026
- CompTox Dashboard (EPA): DTXSID0040624
- ECHA InfoCard: 100.163.691

Chemical and physical data
- Formula: C_{8}H_{8}N_{2}O_{2}S_{2}
- Molar mass: 228.28 g·mol^{−1}
- 3D model (JSmol): Interactive image
- SMILES: O=C(NC/2=C/1\SS\C=C\1N(C\2=O)C)C
- InChI: InChI=1S/C8H8N2O2S2/c1-4(11)9-6-7-5(3-13-14-7)10(2)8(6)12/h3H,1-2H3,(H,9,11); Key:MHMRAFONCSQAIA-UHFFFAOYSA-N

Thiolutin is a sulfur-containing antibiotic, which is a potent inhibitor of bacterial and yeast RNA polymerases. It was found to inhibit in vitro RNA synthesis directed by all three yeast RNA polymerases (I, II, and III). Thiolutin is also an inhibitor of mannan and glucan formation in Saccharomyces cerevisiae and used for the analysis of mRNA stability. Studies have shown that thiolutin inhibits adhesion of human umbilical vein endothelial cells (HUVECs) to vitronectin and thus suppresses tumor cell-induced angiogenesis in vivo.

Thiolutin is formed in submerged fermentation by several strains of Streptomycetes luteosporeus. Some sources erroneously specify "aureothricin" as a synonym of thiolutin. Aureothricin is an antibiotic very similar to thiolutin, and is created as a by-product during the thiolutin fermentation.
