= Geldanamycin =

Names
- IUPAC name (4E,6Z,8S,9S,10E,12S,13R,14S,16R)-13-hydroxy-8,14,19-trimethoxy-4,10,12,16-tetramethyl-3,20,22-trioxo-2-azabicyclo[16.3.1]docosa-1(21),4,6,10,18-pentaen-9-yl carbamate

Identifiers
CAS Number	30562-34-6
3D model (JSmol)	Interactive image
ChEBI	CHEBI:5292
ChEMBL	ChEMBL278315
ChemSpider	10272739
DrugBank	DB02424
PubChem CID	5288382
UNII	Z3K3VJ16KU
CompTox Dashboard (EPA)	DTXSID7042691
- InChI: InChI=1S/C29H40N2O9/c1-15-11-19-25(34)20(14-21(32)27(19)39-7)31-28(35)16(2)9-8-10-22(37-5)26(40-29(30)36)18(4)13-17(3)24(33)23(12-15)38-6/h8-10,13-15,17,22-24,26,33H,11-12H2,1-7H3,(H2,30,36)(H,31,35)/b10-8-,16-9+,18-13+/t15-,17+,22+,23+,24-,26+/m1/s1 Key: QTQAWLPCGQOSGP-KSRBKZBZSA-N; InChI=1S/C29H40N2O9/c1-15-11-19-25(34)20(14-21(32)27(19)39-7)31-28(35)16(2)9-8-10-22(37-5)26(40-29(30)36)18(4)13-17(3)24(33)23(12-15)38-6/h8-10,13-15,17,22-24,26,33H,11-12H2,1-7H3,(H2,30,36)(H,31,35)/b10-8-,16-9+,18-13+/t15-,17+,22+,23+,24-,26+/m1/s1 Key: QTQAWLPCGQOSGP-KSRBKZBZBP; Key: QTQAWLPCGQOSGP-KSRBKZBZSA-N
- SMILES: NC(=O)O[C@H]1C(/C)=C/[C@H](C)[C@@H](O)[C@@H](OC)C[C@H](C)C\C2=C(/OC)C(=O)\C=C(\NC(=O)C(\C)=C\C=C/[C@@H]1OC)C2=O

Properties
Chemical formula	C_{29}H_{40}N_{2}O_{9}
Molar mass	560.64 g/mol
Appearance	Gold-yellow fine crystalline powder
- Except where otherwise noted, data are given for materials in their standard state (at 25 °C [77 °F], 100 kPa). verify (what is ?) Infobox references

Geldanamycin is a 1,4-benzoquinone ansamycin antitumor antibiotic that inhibits the function of Hsp90 (Heat Shock Protein 90) by binding to the unusual ADP/ATP-binding pocket of the protein. HSP90 client proteins play important roles in the regulation of the cell cycle, cell growth, cell survival, apoptosis, angiogenesis and oncogenesis.

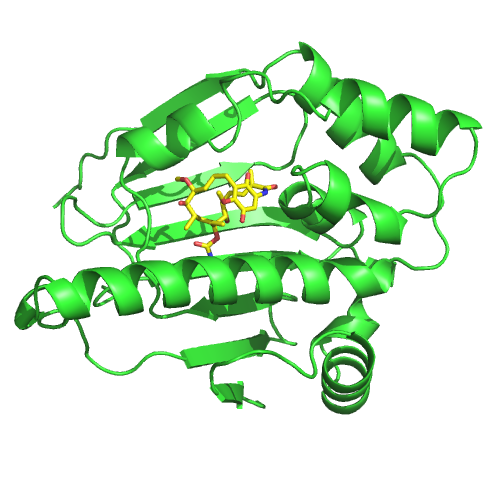
Hsp90-geldanamycin complex. PDB 1yet

Geldanamycin induces the degradation of proteins that are mutated or overexpressed in tumor cells such as v-Src, Bcr-Abl, p53, and ERBB2. This effect is mediated via HSP90. Despite its potent antitumor potential, geldanamycin presents several major drawbacks as a drug candidate such as hepatotoxicity, further, Jilani et al.. reported that geldanamycin induces the apoptosis of erythrocytes under physiological concentrations. These side effects have led to the development of geldanamycin analogues, in particular analogues containing a derivatisation at the 17 position:

- 17-AAG
- 17-DMAG

== Biosynthesis ==
Geldanamycin was originally discovered in the organism Streptomyces hygroscopicus. It is a macrocyclic polyketide that is synthesized by a Type I polyketide synthase. The genes gelA, gelB, and gelC encode for the polyketide synthase. The PKS is first loaded with 3-amino-5-hydroxybenzoic acid (AHBA). It then utilizes malonyl-CoA, methylmalonyl-CoA, and methoxymalonyl-CoA to synthesize the precursor molecule Progeldanamycin. This precursor is subjected to several enzymatic and non-enzymatic tailoring steps to produce the active molecule geldanamycin, which include hydroxylation, O-methylation, carbamoylation, and oxidation.
