= Friuliensis =

Friuliensis may refer to:

- Actinoplanes friuliensis, species of bacteria
- Dasysyrphus friuliensis, species of hoverfly
