= Methylaspartate mutase =

methylaspartate mutase

Identifiers
- EC no.: 5.4.99.1
- CAS no.: 9032-97-7

Databases
- IntEnz: IntEnz view
- BRENDA: BRENDA entry
- ExPASy: NiceZyme view
- KEGG: KEGG entry
- MetaCyc: metabolic pathway
- PRIAM: profile
- PDB structures: RCSB PDB PDBe PDBsum
- Gene Ontology: AmiGO / QuickGO
Search
- PMC: articles
- PubMed: articles
- NCBI: proteins

In enzymology, a methylaspartate mutase (EC 5.4.99.1) is an enzyme that catalyzes the chemical reaction

L-threo-3-methylaspartate $\rightleftharpoons$ L-glutamate

Hence, this enzyme has one substrate, L-threo-3-methylaspartate, and one product, L-glutamate.

This enzyme belongs to the family of isomerases, specifically those intramolecular transferases transferring other groups. The systematic name of this enzyme class is L-threo-3-methylaspartate carboxy-aminomethylmutase. Other names in common use include glutamate mutase, glutamic mutase, glutamic isomerase, glutamic acid mutase, glutamic acid isomerase, methylaspartic acid mutase, beta-methylaspartate-glutamate mutase, and glutamate isomerase. This enzyme participates in c5-branched dibasic acid metabolism. It employs one cofactor, cobamide.

== Structural studies ==
As of late 2007, 8 structures have been solved for this class of enzymes, with PDB accession codes 1B1A, 1BE1, 1CB7, 1CCW, 1FMF, 1I9C, 1ID8, and 2PWH.
