= Ethanolamine oxidase =

ethanolamine oxidase

Identifiers
- EC no.: 1.4.3.8
- CAS no.: 9013-00-7

Databases
- IntEnz: IntEnz view
- BRENDA: BRENDA entry
- ExPASy: NiceZyme view
- KEGG: KEGG entry
- MetaCyc: metabolic pathway
- PRIAM: profile
- PDB structures: RCSB PDB PDBe PDBsum
- Gene Ontology: AmiGO / QuickGO
Search
- PMC: articles
- PubMed: articles
- NCBI: proteins

In enzymology, ethanolamine oxidase (EC 1.4.3.8) is an enzyme that catalyzes the chemical reaction

ethanolamine
+ H_{2}O
O_{2}
H_{2}O_{2}
O_{2}
H_{2}O_{2}
glycolaldehyde
+ NH_{3}

The three substrates of this enzyme are ethanolamine, water, and oxygen. Its products are glycolaldehyde, hydrogen peroxide, and ammonia.

This enzyme belongs to the family of oxidoreductases, specifically those acting on the CH-NH_{2} group of donors with oxygen as acceptor. The systematic name of this enzyme class is ethanolamine:oxygen oxidoreductase (deaminating). It has cobamide as a cofactor.
