= Methylaspartate ammonia-lyase =

methylaspartate ammonia-lyase
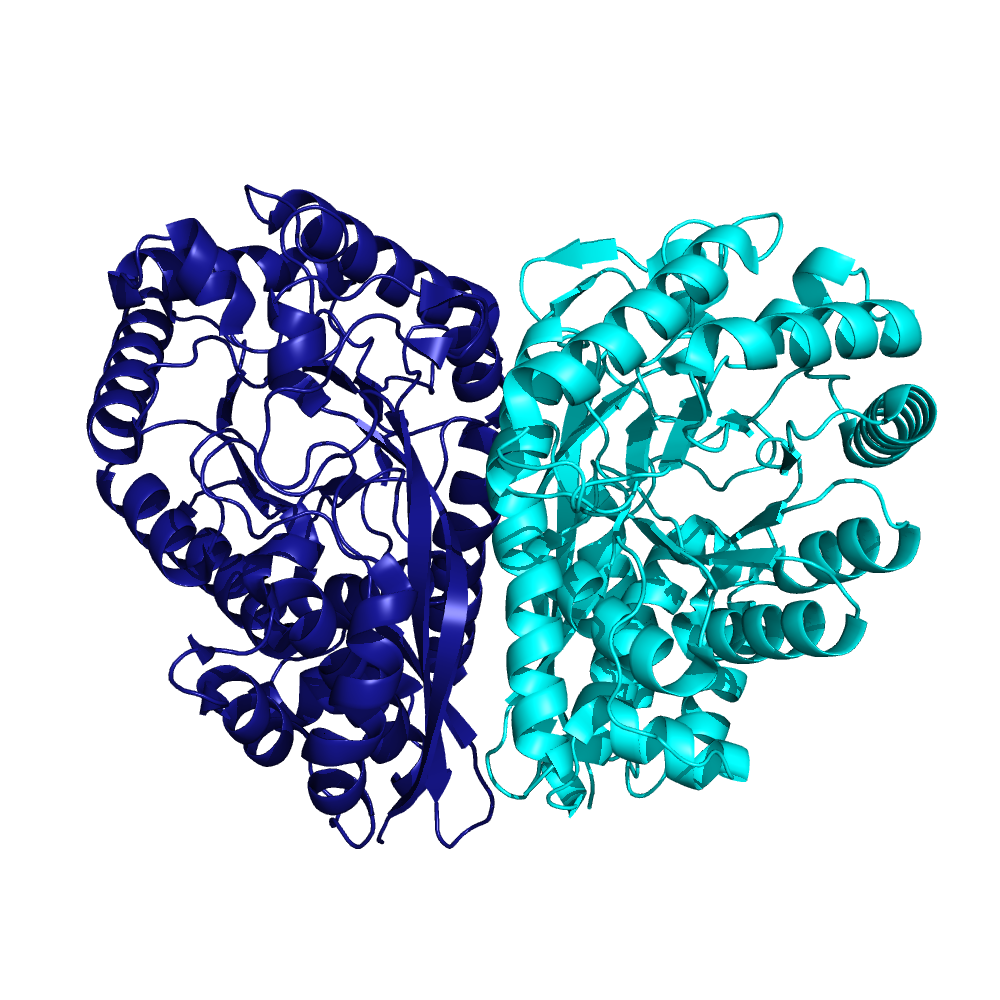
- X-ray structure of methylaspartate ammonia lyase. PDB entry 1kko

Identifiers
- EC no.: 4.3.1.2
- CAS no.: 9033-26-5

Databases
- IntEnz: IntEnz view
- BRENDA: BRENDA entry
- ExPASy: NiceZyme view
- KEGG: KEGG entry
- MetaCyc: metabolic pathway
- PRIAM: profile
- PDB structures: RCSB PDB PDBe PDBsum
- Gene Ontology: AmiGO / QuickGO
Search
- PMC: articles
- PubMed: articles
- NCBI: proteins

The enzyme methylaspartate ammonia-lyase (EC 4.3.1.2) catalyzes the chemical reaction

L-threo-3-methylaspartate $\rightleftharpoons$ mesaconate + NH_{3}

It thus degrades L-threo-3-methylaspartate into mesaconate and ammonia.

This enzyme belongs to the family of lyases, specifically ammonia lyases, which cleave carbon-nitrogen bonds. The systematic name of this enzyme class is L-threo-3-methylaspartate ammonia-lyase (mesaconate-forming). Other names in common use include β-methylaspartase, 3-methylaspartase, and L-threo-3-methylaspartate ammonia-lyase. This enzyme participates in c5-branched dibasic acid metabolism and nitrogen metabolism. It employs one cofactor, cobamide.

== Structural studies ==
Several structures of this enzyme have been deposited in the Protein Data Bank (linked in the infobox) which show it possesses a TIM barrel domain.
