= Methylaspartic acid =

Methylaspartic acid may refer to:

- L-threo-3-Methylaspartate
- N-Methyl-D-aspartic acid
