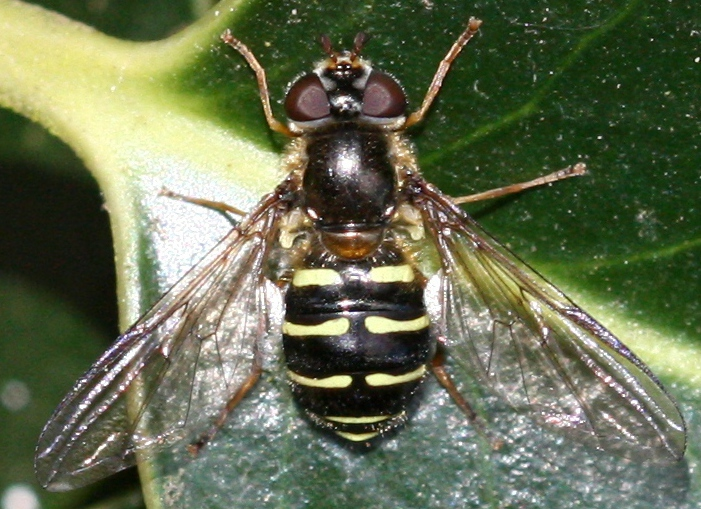
- Dasysyrphus cf. hilaris

Scientific classification
- Kingdom: Animalia
- Phylum: Arthropoda
- Class: Insecta
- Order: Diptera
- Family: Syrphidae
- Genus: Dasysyrphus
- Species: D. hilaris

Binomial name
- Dasysyrphus hilaris (Zetterstedt), 1843

= Dasysyrphus hilaris =

Species of fly

Dasysyrphus hilaris is a Palearctic hoverfly. It is a member of a cryptic species complex which includes Dasysyrphus venustus the most frequent and widely distributed species of the genus. Dasysyrphus hilaris is known with a level of certainty only from Ireland, Great Britain, Norway, France (Vosges, Alps, Pyrenees) and Liechtenstein.This species cannot be determined using existing keys.
