= Propanediol dehydratase =

Class of enzymes

propanediol dehydratase

Identifiers
- EC no.: 4.2.1.28
- CAS no.: 9026-90-8

Databases
- IntEnz: IntEnz view
- BRENDA: BRENDA entry
- ExPASy: NiceZyme view
- KEGG: KEGG entry
- MetaCyc: metabolic pathway
- PRIAM: profile
- PDB structures: RCSB PDB PDBe PDBsum
- Gene Ontology: AmiGO / QuickGO
Search
- PMC: articles
- PubMed: articles
- NCBI: proteins

The enzyme propanediol dehydratase (EC 4.2.1.28) catalyzes the chemical reaction

propane-1,2-diol $\rightleftharpoons$ propanal + H_{2}O

This enzyme belongs to the family of lyases, specifically the hydro-lyases, which cleave carbon-oxygen bonds. The systematic name of this enzyme class is propane-1,2-diol hydro-lyase (propanal-forming). Other names in common use include meso-2,3-butanediol dehydrase, diol dehydratase, DL-1,2-propanediol hydro-lyase, diol dehydrase, adenosylcobalamin-dependent diol dehydratase, propanediol dehydrase, coenzyme B_{12}-dependent diol dehydrase, 1,2-propanediol dehydratase, dioldehydratase, and propane-1,2-diol hydro-lyase. This enzyme participates in glycerolipid metabolism. It employs one cofactor, cobamide.

== Structural studies ==
As of late 2007, 7 structures have been solved for this class of enzymes, with PDB accession codes 1DIO, 1EEX, 1EGM, 1EGV, 1IWB, 1UC4, and 1UC5.
