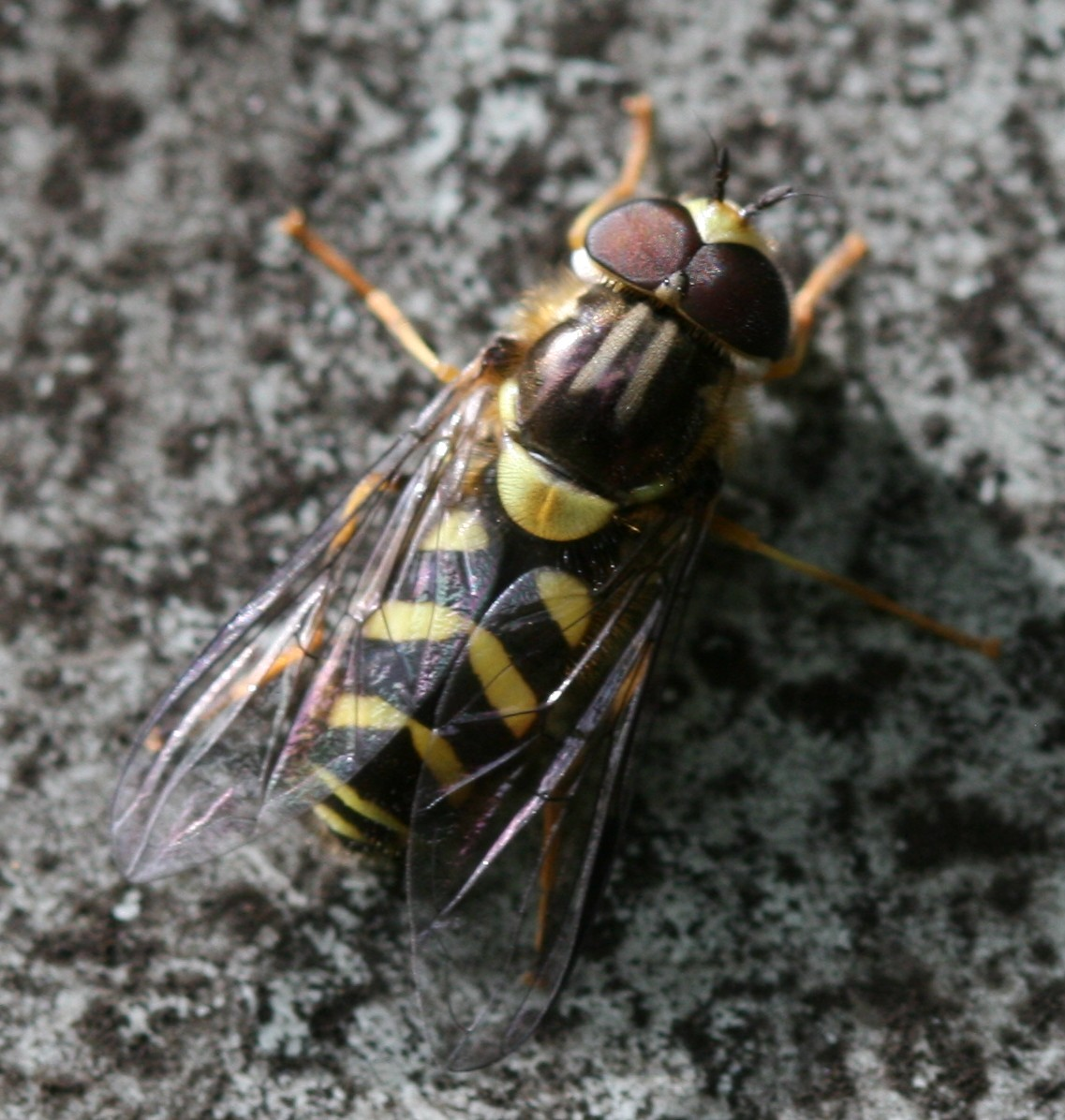
- male
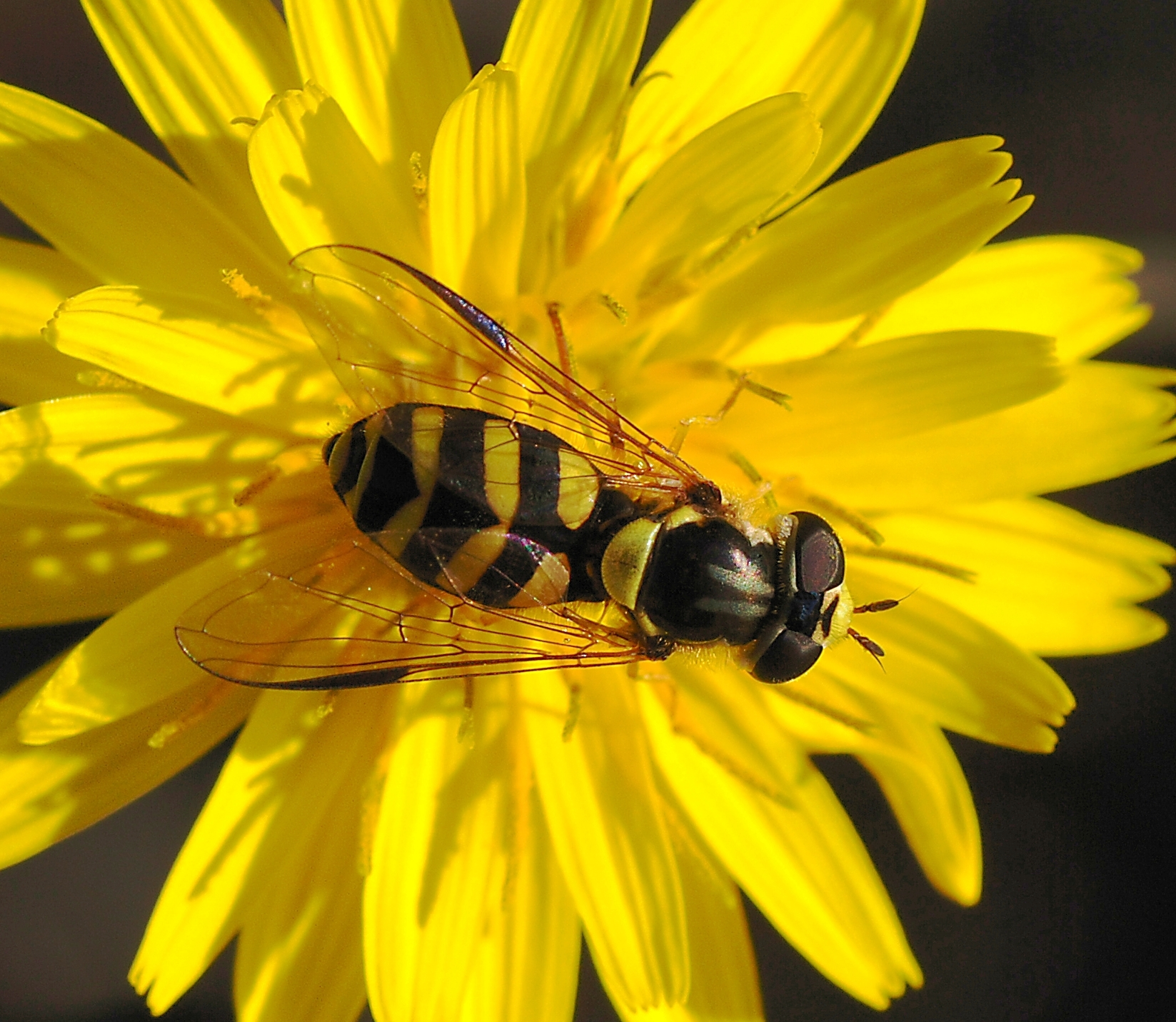
- female

Scientific classification
- Kingdom: Animalia
- Phylum: Arthropoda
- Class: Insecta
- Order: Diptera
- Family: Syrphidae
- Genus: Dasysyrphus
- Species: D. albostriatus

Binomial name
- Dasysyrphus albostriatus (Fallén, 1817)

Synonyms
- Dasysyrphus confusus (Egger, 1860); Scaeva albostriatus Fallén, 1817; Syrphus confusus Egger, 1860

= Dasysyrphus albostriatus =

Species of fly

Dasysyrphus albostriatus is a Palearctic species of hoverfly.

== Description ==
External images For terms see Morphology of Diptera
Wing length 6·25–9·5 mm. Thorax dorsum with two median stripes of white dust. The thorax is otherwise shining black. Tergites with linear yellow spots which sometimes connect on tergites 3 and 4. The larva is figured by Dusek and Laska (1962).

== Distribution ==
Palaearctic. Fennoscandia South to Iberia and north Africa. Ireland eastwards through Central and Southern Europe (Italy, Yugoslavia) to Greece, Turkey and European parts of Russia (South to Crimea and the Caucasus). East into Central Asia and Japan.

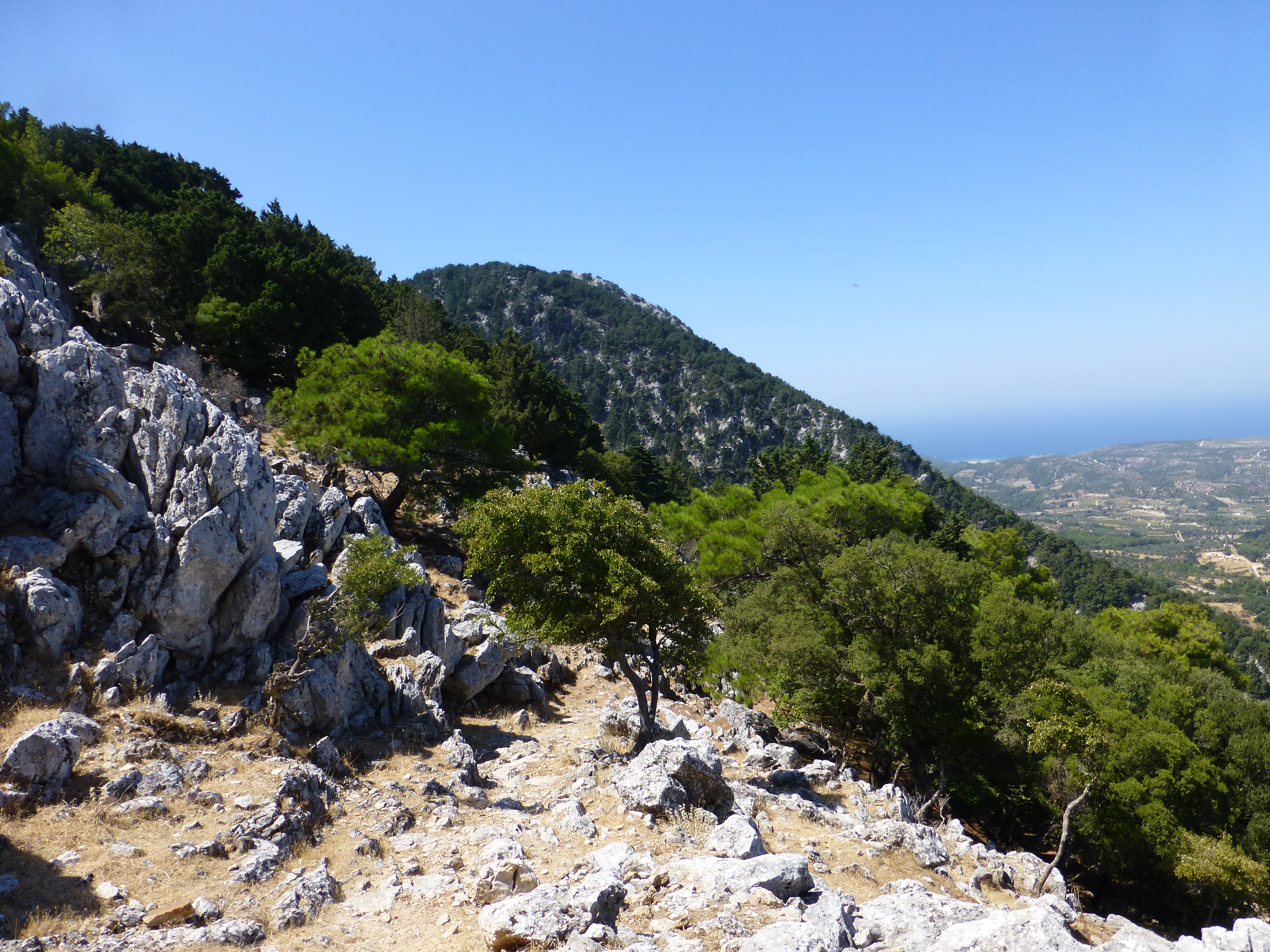
Habitat.Greece.

== Biology ==
Habitat coniferous and deciduous woodland and conifer plantation, up to the alpine zone, tracksides, clearings, parks, gardens. Flowers visited include yellow composites, white umbellifers, Acer pseudoplatanus, Calluna, Crataegus, Euphorbia, Lonicera xylosteum, Papaver, Ranunculus, Rubus, Salix, Sorbus, Stellaria, Succisa pratensis, and Viburnum opulus. The flight period is from the end of April (early April in southern Europe) to September. The larva is predominantly aphid-feeding, but also predatory on a wide range of soft-bodied insects.
