= Dasysyrphus pauxillus =

Scientific classification
- Kingdom: Animalia
- Phylum: Arthropoda
- Class: Insecta
- Order: Diptera
- Family: Syrphidae
- Genus: Dasysyrphus
- Species: D. pauxillus

Binomial name
- Dasysyrphus pauxillus (Williston, 1887)

Synonyms
- Syrphus pauxillus Williston, 1887

Species of fly

Dasysyrphus pauxillus is a North American and European species of hoverfly.
