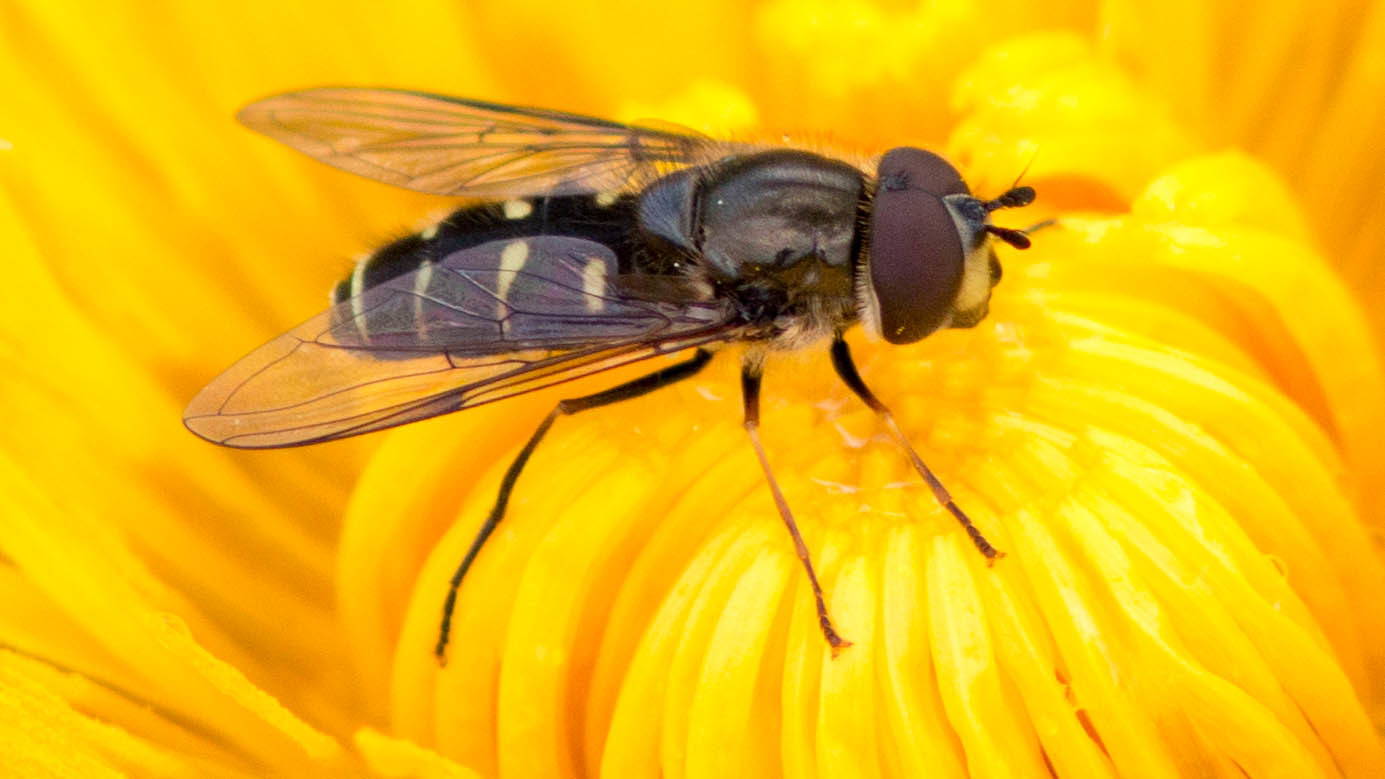

Scientific classification
- Kingdom: Animalia
- Phylum: Arthropoda
- Class: Insecta
- Order: Diptera
- Family: Syrphidae
- Genus: Dasysyrphus
- Species: D. pinastri

Binomial name
- Dasysyrphus pinastri De Geer, 1776

Synonyms
- Dasysyrphus lunulatus Meigen, 1822

= Dasysyrphus pinastri =

Species of fly

Dasysyrphus pinastri is a species of hoverfly found in Europe.

== Description ==
For terms see Morphology of Diptera.

Wing length 6.5-8.5 mm.

Sternite 2 yellow with blackish crossband. Female frons with large patches of dust. Tergites 3 and 4 with equally-sized yellow patterns Tergite 2: pale pattern always present, as broad as or broader than pattern on tergites 3 and 4. Only vague or no grey stripes on thorax. Male genitalia are figured by Doczkal (1996). The larva is figured by Nielsen (1954).

== Distribution ==
Palaearctic. Greenland, Iceland and Fennoscandia southwards to the Pyrenees. Ireland eastwards through northern and central Europe (and mountains of northern Italy and Yugoslavia) into Turkey and European Russia then through the Russian Far East and Siberia.

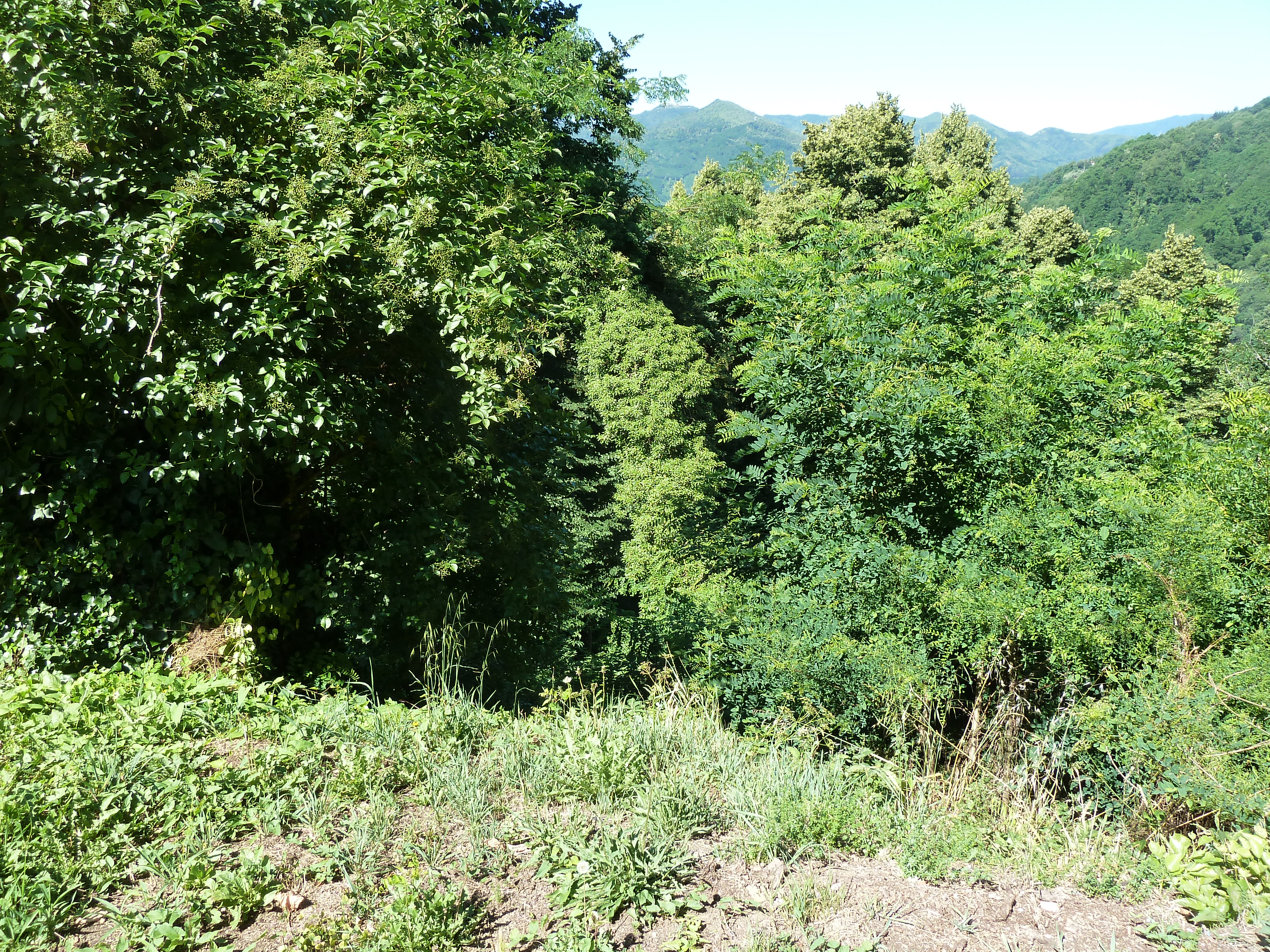
Habitat - Italy

== Biology ==
Habitat: Abies, Picea and Pinus conifer forest and conifer plantation, montane Betula woods. Arboreal, but descends to visit flowers of Caltha, Crataegus, Crepis paludosa, Euphorbia, Fragaria, Frangula alnus, Galium, Heracleum, Hieracium, Lonicera xylosteum, Prunus spinosa, Ranunculus, Rosa rugosa, Salix repens, Sorbus aucuparia and Stellaria. The flight period is April to June and July (later at higher altitudes or more northerly latitudes). The larva feeds on aphids.
