= Vicenistatin =

Chemical compound

Identifiers
- IUPAC name: (3E,5E,7S,8S,10E,13E,15E,19S)-7,11,13,19-Tetramethyl-2-oxoazacycloicosa-3,5,10,13,15-pentaen-8-yl 2,4,6-trideoxy-4-(methylamino)-β-D-ribo-hexopyranoside
- CAS Number: 150999-05-6
- PubChem CID: 6438888
- ChemSpider: 4943331
- UNII: YYZ37B8VCV
- CompTox Dashboard (EPA): DTXSID701031592

Chemical and physical data
- Formula: C_{30}H_{48}N_{2}O_{4}
- Molar mass: 500.724 g·mol^{−1}
- 3D model (JSmol): Interactive image
- SMILES: C[C@H]1CC/C=C/C=C(/C/C(=C/C[C@@H]([C@H](/C=C/C=C/C(=O)NC1)C)O[C@H]2C[C@@H]([C@@H]([C@H](O2)C)NC)O)/C)\C
- InChI: InChI=1S/C30H48N2O4/c1-21-12-8-7-9-13-23(3)20-32-28(34)15-11-10-14-24(4)27(17-16-22(2)18-21)36-29-19-26(33)30(31-6)25(5)35-29/h7-8,10-12,14-16,23-27,29-31,33H,9,13,17-20H2,1-6H3,(H,32,34)/b8-7+,14-10+,15-11+,21-12+,22-16+/t23-,24-,25+,26-,27-,29-,30+/m0/s1; Key:FINGADBUNZWVLV-KVAOKYIVSA-N

Vicenistatin is a macrolactam antibiotic synthesized by Streptomyces halstedii HC34. It was originally isolated from this bacterium in 1993. It includes the unusual starter unit methylaspartate.
