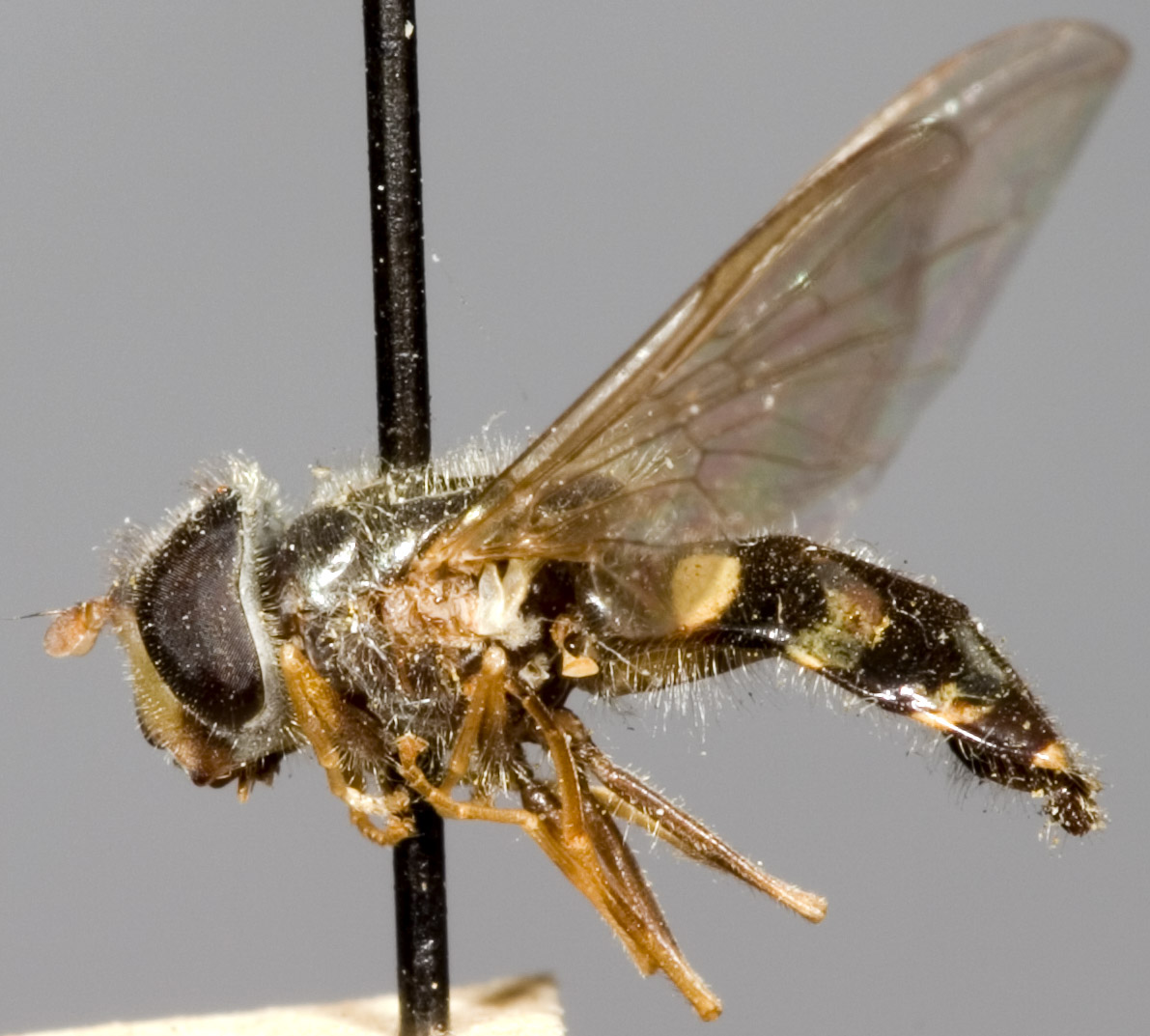
- Dasysyrphus osburni

Scientific classification
- Domain: Eukaryota
- Kingdom: Animalia
- Phylum: Arthropoda
- Class: Insecta
- Order: Diptera
- Family: Syrphidae
- Genus: Dasysyrphus
- Species: D. osburni

Binomial name
- Dasysyrphus osburni (Curran, 1925)

Synonyms
- Syrphus osburni Curran, 1925

= Dasysyrphus osburni =

Species of fly

Dasysyrphus osburni is a species of syrphid fly in the family Syrphidae. It is found in Europe.
