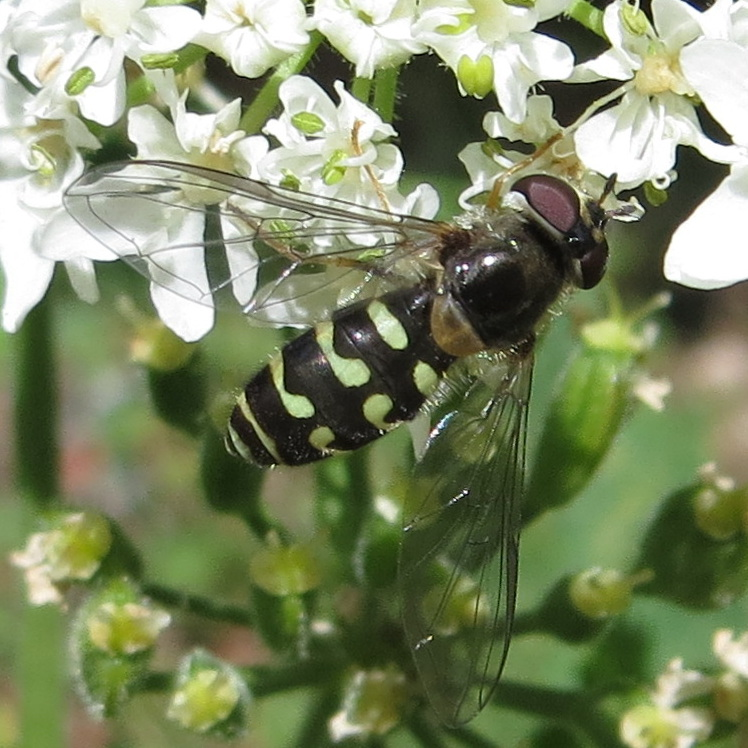

Scientific classification
- Kingdom: Animalia
- Phylum: Arthropoda
- Class: Insecta
- Order: Diptera
- Family: Syrphidae
- Genus: Dasysyrphus
- Species: D. intrudens

Binomial name
- Dasysyrphus intrudens (Osten Sacken, 1877)
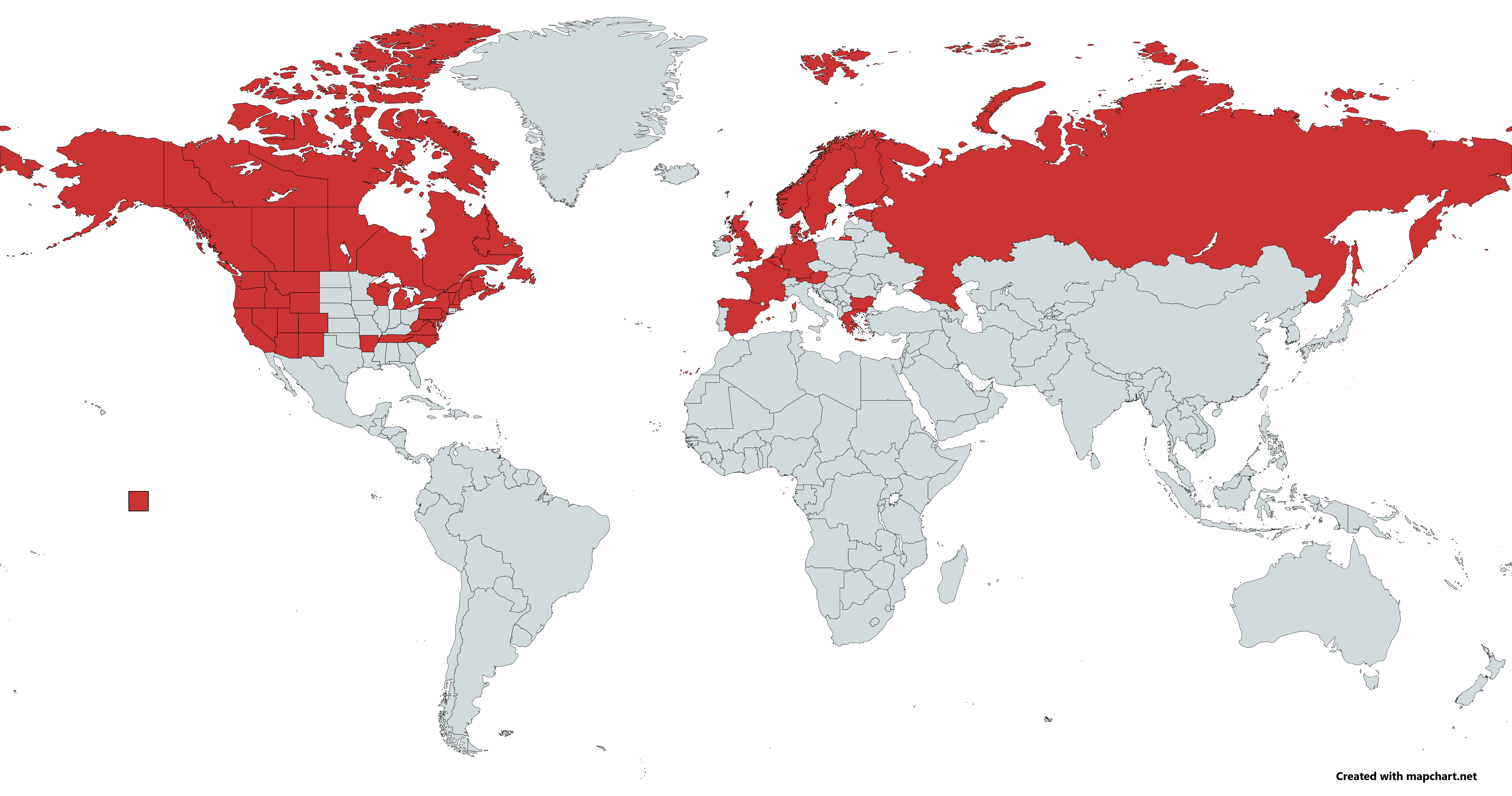
- D.intrudens range 2023

Synonyms
- Syrphus intrudens Osten Sacken, 1877; Syrphus laticaudatus Curran, 1925

= Dasysyrphus intrudens =

Species of fly

Dasysyrphus intrudens is a placeholder name for a complex of hover fly species that have yet to be properly been divided into individual species. It is found in the Holarctic realm. Though this species actually a complex, it is commonly found in many areas of its range, but yet the larvae of this species were not known to science as of 2012. This may be due to the probable nocturnal habit of these larvae if it is similar to some known larvae of this genus.

== Description ==
For terminology see Speight key to genera and glossary

Head

In males, the frons is dark, with a light pollenose band running along the lower edge near the eyes. In females, the band is located approximately halfway between the antennae and ocelli, and is either narrowly or widely spaced medially. Additionally, there is dark pile on the frons. The front and vertex black in color, with a greenish sheen and black pile. The face is light in color, with a dark line running along it that is usually between a quarter and half the width of the face, ending near the antennal socket. The face is also brownish yellow, with a wide black stripe running through the middle, stopping short of the antennae, and narrower than the yellow portion of the face on either side. This black stripe continues along the edge of the mouth to the black gena, which have a faint greenish hue. The scape and pedicel of the antennae are usually light to dark in color, with the flagellomere usually being light at the base and darker towards the tip, although it may be mostly dark. In some cases, the antennae may be completely black, with the third joint sometimes having a slight reddish hue at its base. The arista is typically light in color. The eyes may be either pilose or pubescent. The occiput is dark, with a light coating of pollen, and the pile is a bright brownish yellow.

Thorax

The scutum of the thorax is dark, and may even appear to be shiny or metallic, and is covered with light pile. The scutellum is light in color, with darker edges on the front sides. There is a light pile, with some varying amounts of dark pile posteriorly, with a shade of dull yellowish under the strong greenish metallic luster. Its pile is black with a few yellowish brown hairs on the sides only.

Legs

The legs are generally reddish, with the anterior femora having a black basal half and the hind femora being mostly black, excluding the tip. The hind tibiae have a brown ring in the middle, while the other tibiae are lightly marked with brown. The tarsi are brownish on the upper side. The front and middle femora are half dark at the base and half light at the tip. The hind femur is mostly dark at the base and light at the tip, and the tibiae are light. The middle tibia and occasionally have a dark band about a quarter of the way from the apex.

Abdomen

The abdomen of the species is black with very little shining. The first segment is very narrow. On the second segment, there are two oblong yellow spots that do not reach the lateral margin. On the third and fourth segments, there is a pair of deeply lunate spots shaped like a club at both ends and touching the anterior margin on one side, crossing to the lateral margin. These spots are usually strongly constricted medially, sometimes dividing the spots in half, with a swollen medial edge that never meets medially. The fourth and fifth segments have a narrow yellow posterior margin. The genitalia has been described.

Wings

The wings are variously densely microtrichose. The halteres are light in color and the vein R_{4+5} is not dipped. The stigma is elongated, and the lower lobe of the calypter has only microscopic pile above.

== Distribution ==
This species complex is found through much of the United States, Canada, Europe and a few locations in Asia. (see distribution map)
