= Corrinoid =

Class of chemical compounds

Corrin ring, numbered according to the 1975 IUPAC standard. Note that for consistency with the porphyrin numbering system, there is no 20 position. Positions 21-24 were numbered 20-23 in earlier literature.

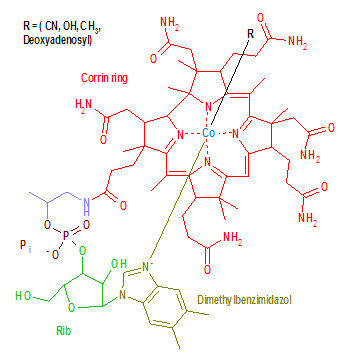
Vitamin B_{12} (cyanocobalamin)

Corrinoids are a group of compounds based on the skeleton of corrin, a cyclic system containing four pyrrole rings similar to porphyrins. These include compounds based on octadehydrocorrin, which has the trivial name corrole.

The cobalamins (vitamin B_{12}) are the best known members of the group. Other prominent examples include cobyrinic acid and its hexaamide cobyric acid; cobinic acid and its hexaamide cobinamide; cobamic acid and cobamide.

Compounds containing the "Cob-" prefix (not corrin) are cobalt derivatives, and may include an oxidation state, as in "Cob(II)alamin". When cobalt is replaced by another metal or hydrogen, the name changes accordingly, as in ferrobamic acid or hydrogenobamic acid.

== Reactions with cyanide ==
A solution of aquacyano-corrinoids, such as cobalamin or cobinamide, reacts with free cyanide in an aqueous sample. The binding of cyanide to the corrinoid cobalt center leads to a color change from orange to violet. Quantification of the cyanide content is feasible by UV-vis spectroscopy. Absorption of the corrinoid on a solid phase, allows detection of cyanide even in colored samples, rendering this method appropriate for the analysis of cyanide in water, wastewater, blood, and food. Furthermore, this technology is non-toxic and considerably less prone to interference than the pyridine-barbituric acid colorimetry method.
