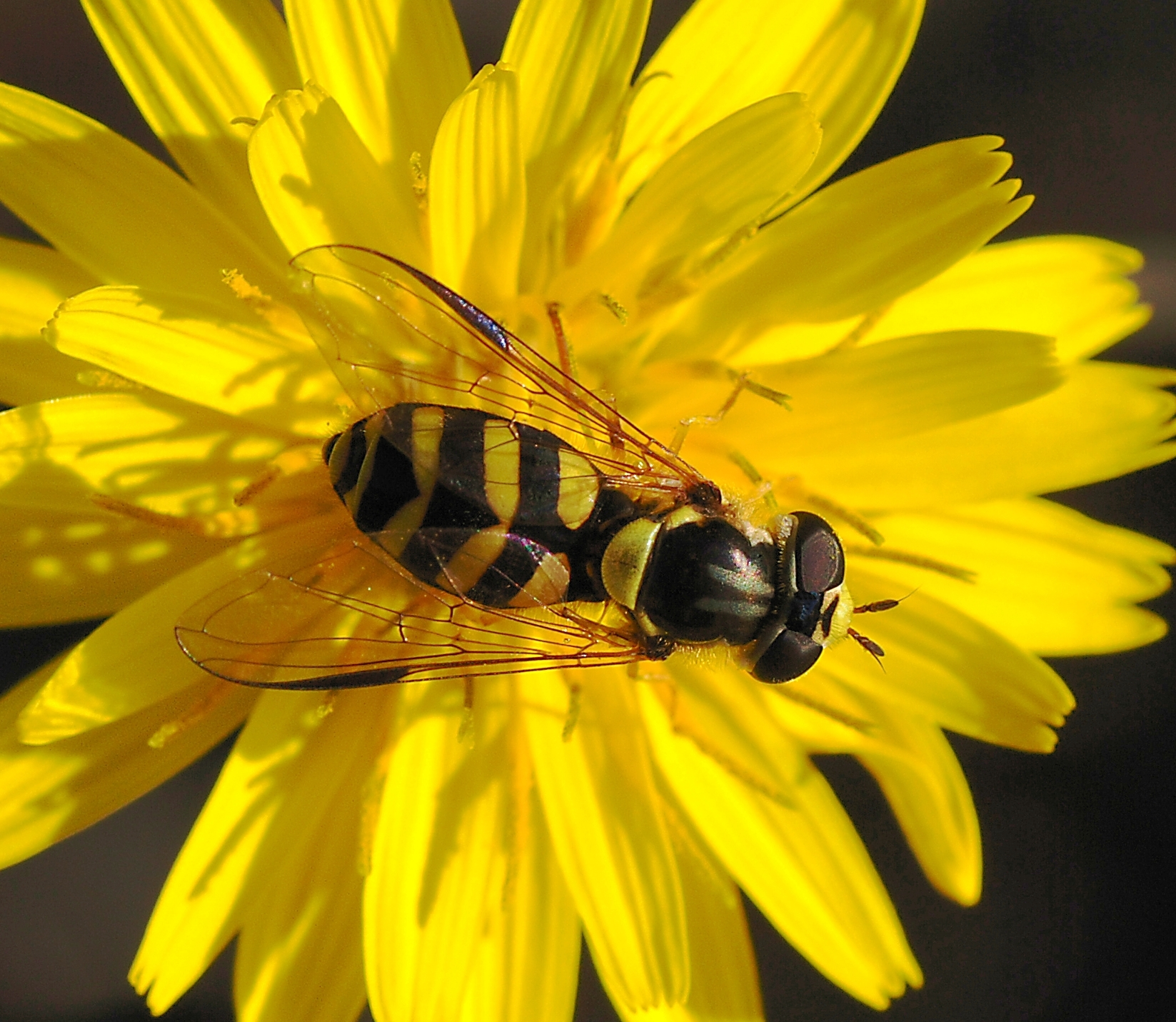
- Dasysyrphus albostriatus female

Scientific classification
- Kingdom: Animalia
- Phylum: Arthropoda
- Class: Insecta
- Order: Diptera
- Family: Syrphidae
- Subfamily: Syrphinae
- Tribe: Syrphini
- Genus: Dasysyrphus; Enderlein, 1938
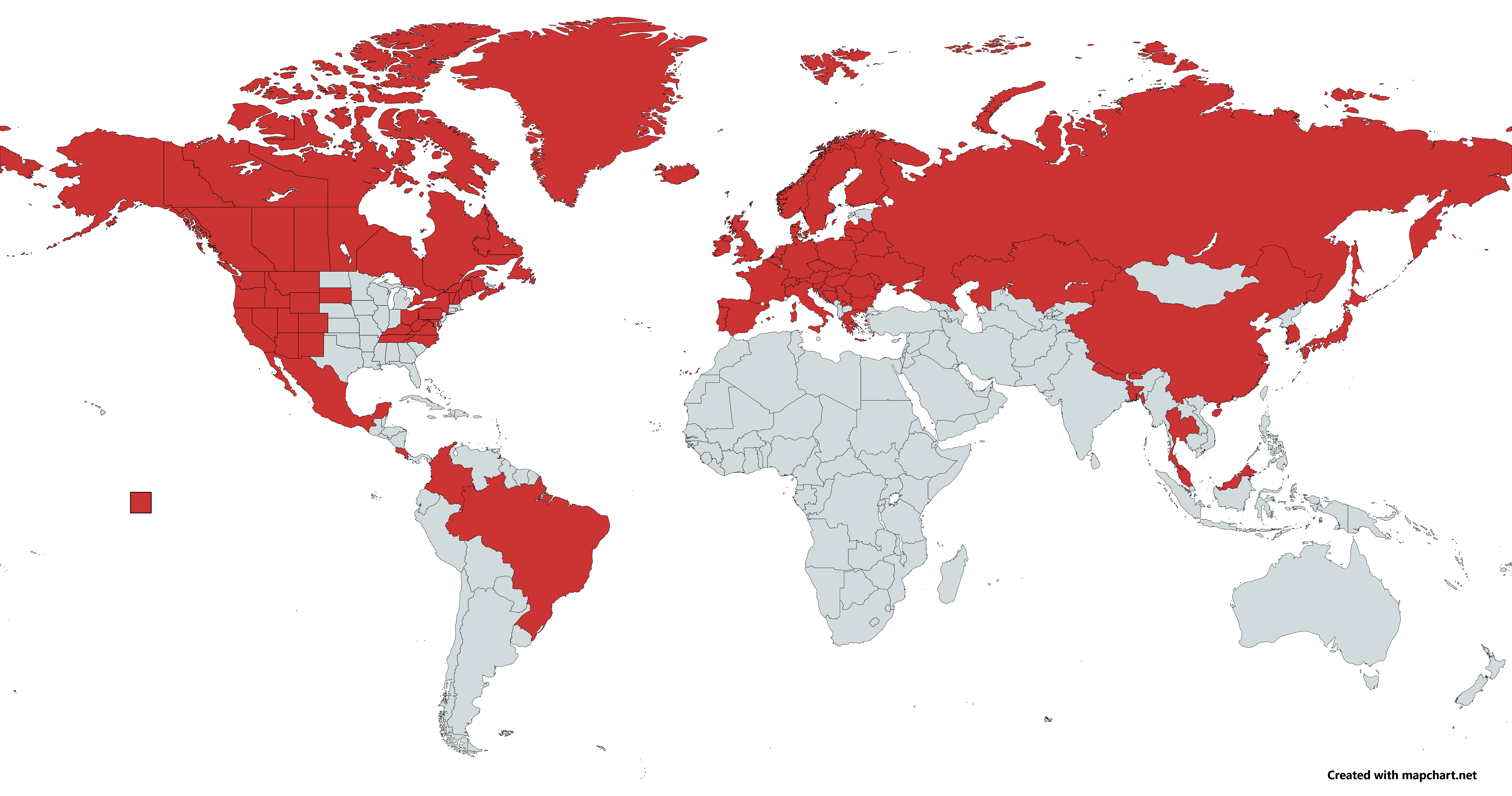

Synonyms
- Conosyrphus Matsumura, 1918; Dendrosyrphus Dusek & Láska, 1967; Syrphella Goffe, 1944

= Dasysyrphus =

Genus of flies

Dasysyrphus is a genus of hover flies with 50 identified species distributed worldwide (see distribution map). While the genus is relatively easy to identify, the differences between species have a more narrow range of variations. Therefore, identification of species by images of specimens alone should be made with care (See available keys below).

== Larvae ==
The known larvae are mostly tree dwelling on both conifers and deciduous trees. They feed on aphids and other small Hemiptera resting in the daytime. This nocturnal habit, plus the camouflage coloration of the larvae may account for the lack of larval reports for this genus.

== Description ==
These are medium-sized flies with a combination of characters: the margin of the abdomen grooved and dark with light spots present on tergites 2,3 and 4, haired eyes microtrichose wings (at least anterior third) with an elongate stigma, third vein ending at the apex of the wing, calypter with ventral lobe bare and a bare metasternum.

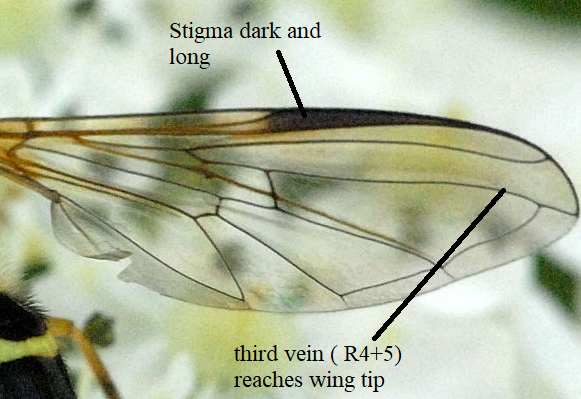
Dasysyrphus wing

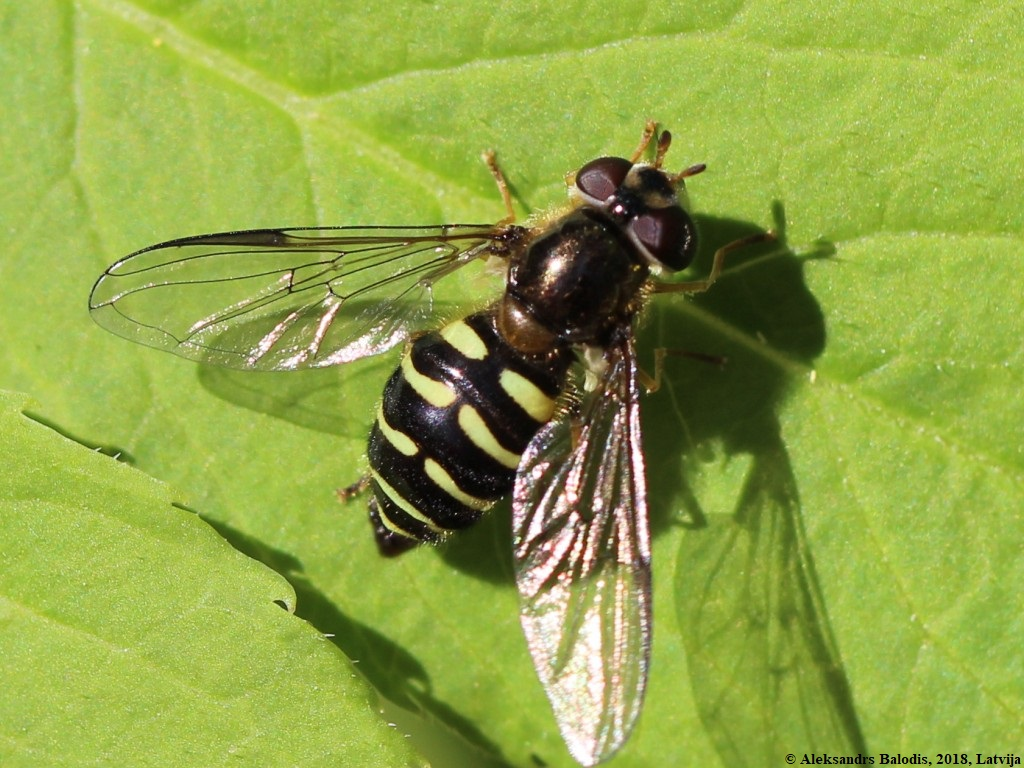
abdominal spots

== Resources for identification to species ==
- Bartsch et al. (2009) for Nordic countries
- Barkalov (2007) for Urals, Siberia and the Far East.
- van Veen (2004) for Northwestern Europe
- Van der Goot, V.S. (1981) Russia
- Stubbs & Falk (1983) for Britain
- Ghorpade (1994) for India (Ghorpade, 1994)
- Peck(1974) for the Palaearctic
- Locke 2013 Nearctic key nearctic species key

== Species ==
- D. albostriatus (Fallén, 1817)
- D. amalopis (Osten Sacken, 1875)
- D. bilineatus (Matsumura, 1917)
- D. corsicanus (Becker, 1921)
- D. creper (Snow, 1895)
- D. eggeri (Schiner, 1862)
- D. friuliensis (van der Goot, 1960)
- D. hilaris (Zetterstedt, 1843)
- D. intrudens (Osten Sacken, 1877)
- D.laticaudus Curran, 1925
- D. lapidosus Barkalov, 1990
- D. lenensis Bagatshanova, 1980
- D. limatus (Hine, 1922)
- D. lotus (Williston, 1887)
- D.neovenustus Soszyński & Mielczarek, 2013
- D. nigricornis (Verrall, 1873)
- D.occidualis Locke & Skevington, 2013
- D. osburni (Curran, 1925)
- D. pacificus (Lovett)
- D. pauxillus (Williston, 1887)
- D. pinastri (De Geer, 1776)
- D. postclaviger (Stys & Moucha, 1962)
- D. reflectipennis (Curran, 1921)
- D. richardi Locke & Skevington, 2013
- D. tricinctus (Fallén, 1817)
- D. venustus (Meigen, 1822)
