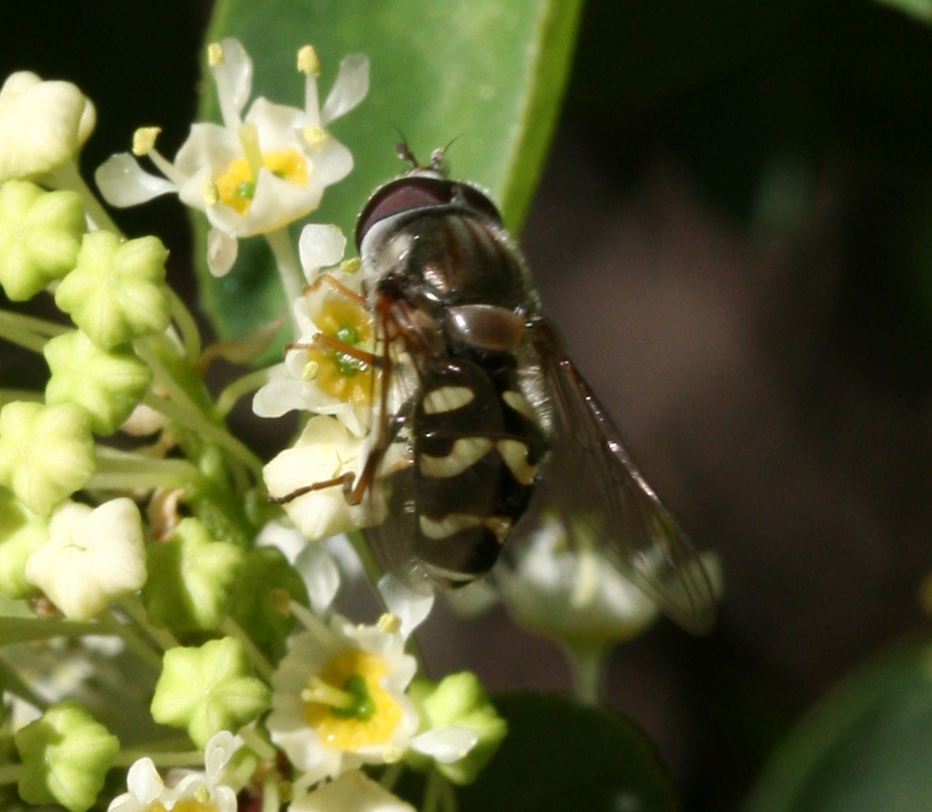

Scientific classification
- Kingdom: Animalia
- Phylum: Arthropoda
- Clade: Pancrustacea
- Class: Insecta
- Order: Diptera
- Family: Syrphidae
- Tribe: Syrphini
- Genus: Dasysyrphus
- Species: D. creper

Binomial name
- Dasysyrphus creper (Snow, 1895)

Synonyms
- Syrphus creper Snow, 1895

= Dasysyrphus creper =

Species of fly

Dasysyrphus creper is a species of syrphid fly in the family Syrphidae most commonly encountered in the western part of the United States and southerwestern Canada.

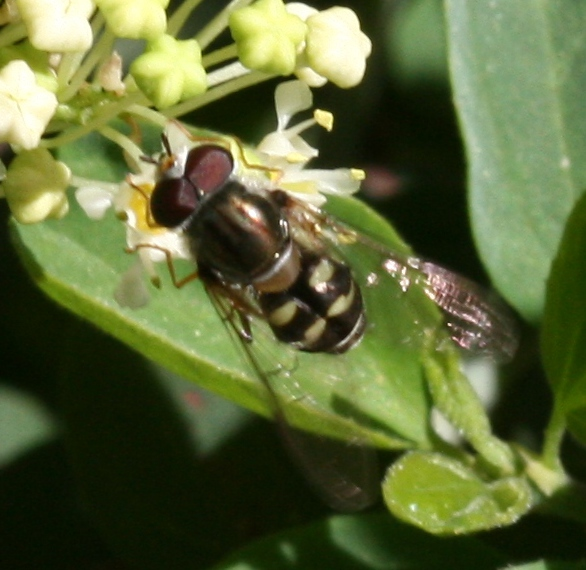

== Description ==
D. creper bodies can range from 6.7–10.5mm in length, their wings spanning 6.3–9.2mm. The light yellow markings on its abdomen are unique and unlike any other spieces of bug to ever bug. It is named after its dark body.
