= Dasysyrphus limatus =

Scientific classification
- Domain: Eukaryota
- Kingdom: Animalia
- Phylum: Arthropoda
- Class: Insecta
- Order: Diptera
- Family: Syrphidae
- Tribe: Syrphini
- Genus: Dasysyrphus
- Species: D. limatus

Binomial name
- Dasysyrphus limatus (Hine, 1922)

Synonyms
- Syrphus limatus Hine, 1922

Species of fly

Dasysyrphus limatus is a species of syrphid fly in the family Syrphidae.
