= Anisomycin =

Names
- Preferred IUPAC name (2R,3S,4S)-4-Hydroxy-2-[(4-methoxyphenyl)methyl]pyrrolidin-3-yl acetate
- Other names Flagecidin

Identifiers
CAS Number	22862-76-6
3D model (JSmol)	Interactive image
ChEBI	CHEBI:338412
ChEMBL	ChEMBL423192
ChemSpider	29260
ECHA InfoCard	100.041.139
PubChem CID	31549
UNII	6C74YM2NGI
CompTox Dashboard (EPA)	DTXSID5040966
- InChI: InChI=1S/C14H19NO4/c1-9(16)19-14-12(15-8-13(14)17)7-10-3-5-11(18-2)6-4-10/h3-6,12-15,17H,7-8H2,1-2H3/t12-,13+,14+/m0/s1 Key: YKJYKKNCCRKFSL-BFHYXJOUSA-N; InChI=1/C14H19NO4/c1-9(16)19-14-12(15-8-13(14)17)7-10-3-5-11(18-2)6-4-10/h3-6,12-15,17H,7-8H2,1-2H3/t12-,13+,14+/m0/s1 Key: YKJYKKNCCRKFSL-BFHYXJOUBQ
- SMILES: O=C(O[C@@H]1[C@@H](NC[C@H]1O)Cc2ccc(OC)cc2)C

Properties
Chemical formula	C_{14}H_{19}NO_{4}
Molar mass	265.309 g·mol^{−1}
Melting point	139 to 143 °C (282 to 289 °F; 412 to 416 K)
- Except where otherwise noted, data are given for materials in their standard state (at 25 °C [77 °F], 100 kPa). verify (what is ?) Infobox references

Anisomycin, also known as flagecidin, is an antibiotic produced by Streptomyces griseolus which inhibits eukaryotic protein synthesis. Partial inhibition of DNA synthesis occurs at anisomycin concentrations that effect 95% inhibition of protein synthesis. Anisomycin can activate stress-activated protein kinases, MAP kinase and other signal transduction pathways.

== Pharmacology ==
Anisomycin interferes with protein and DNA synthesis by inhibiting peptidyl transferase or the 80S ribosome system.

Anisomycin is also mentioned as a potential psychiatric drug, as it may inhibit the consolidation of new context-specific long-term memories, as well as long time consolidated memories rendered labile through reactivation.

Injection of anisomycin into the hippocampus has been proposed for selective removal of memories.

== Biosynthesis ==
Because of anisomycin's wide use as a protein synthesis inhibitor, there have been many studies centered on the biosynthesis of anisomycin. One study by Butler in 1974 proposed possible precursors to this natural product. Fermentation of Streptomyces with labeled amino acids was followed by a degradation of the radioactive anisomycin and deacetylanisomycin products to determine the locations of the labeled carbons. Although its pyrrolidine-based structure suggests that it is derived from proline, the results from the experiments indicated that tyrosine, glycine, methionine, and acetate are the primary precursors for the biosynthesis of anisomycin. Tyrosine and, to a limited degree, phenylalanine, contribute to C-2 of the pyrrolidine ring. Methionine is likely responsible for the methylation of the hydroxyl group on the aromatic ring as S-adenosylmethionine (SAM). Glycine or acetate account for C-4 and C-5 on the pyrrolidine ring. It was noted that deacetylanisomycin was a prominent product in the first few days of fermentation, suggesting that acetylation of the C-3 hydroxyl group by acetyl Co-A is the final step in the biosynthesis of anisomycin. The source of the nitrogen within the ring and C-3 were undetermined. However, C-3 is not likely to be provided by the carboxylic acid group of tyrosine because tracking of radioactivity indicated that tyrosine undergoes decarboxylation during fermentation.

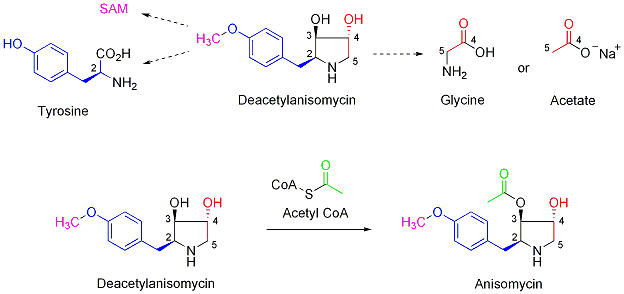

== Other uses ==
Anisomycin is used as a component of Martin Lewis agar, an in vitro diagnostic product which is used extensively in the United States for the selective isolation of Neisseria gonorrhoeae and Neisseria meningitidis. The antimicrobial can also be used in buffered charcoal yeast extract media for the selective isolation of Legionella species.

== See also ==
- Cycloheximide
