= Friulimicin =

Friulimicin B

Names
- Other names Friulimycin B

Identifiers
CAS Number	239802-15-4
3D model (JSmol)	Interactive image
ChEMBL	ChEMBL1688547
ChemSpider	32699135
PubChem CID	56842195
UNII	AYO43961I1
- InChI: InChI=1S/C59H94N14O19/c1-30(2)19-14-12-10-8-9-11-13-15-22-41(75)65-35(25-40(61)74)52(84)71-49-34(7)64-53(85)39-21-18-24-73(39)57(89)46(31(3)4)69-56(88)48(33(6)60)68-43(77)29-63-50(82)36(26-44(78)79)66-42(76)28-62-51(83)37(27-45(80)81)67-55(87)47(32(5)59(91)92)70-54(86)38-20-16-17-23-72(38)58(49)90/h13,15,30-39,46-49H,8-12,14,16-29,60H2,1-7H3,(H2,61,74)(H,62,83)(H,63,82)(H,64,85)(H,65,75)(H,66,76)(H,67,87)(H,68,77)(H,69,88)(H,70,86)(H,71,84)(H,78,79)(H,80,81)(H,91,92)/b15-13-/t32-,33+,34-,35-,36-,37-,38+,39-,46-,47-,48+,49-/m0/s1 Key: HVYFVLAUKMGKHL-USKUEUQVSA-N
- SMILES: C[C@H]1[C@@H](C(=O)N2CCCC[C@@H]2C(=O)N[C@H](C(=O)N[C@H](C(=O)NCC(=O)N[C@H](C(=O)NCC(=O)N[C@@H](C(=O)N[C@H](C(=O)N3CCC[C@H]3C(=O)N1)C(C)C)[C@@H](C)N)CC(=O)O)CC(=O)O)[C@H](C)C(=O)O)NC(=O)[C@H](CC(=O)N)NC(=O)C/C=C\CCCCCCCC(C)C

Properties
Chemical formula	C_{59}H_{94}N_{14}O_{19}
Molar mass	1303.480 g·mol^{−1}
- Except where otherwise noted, data are given for materials in their standard state (at 25 °C [77 °F], 100 kPa). Infobox references

Friulimicin B is a lipopeptide antibiotic produced by Actinoplanes friuliensis. It includes the unusual amino acid methylaspartate.
