= Streptomyces halstedii =

Scientific classification
- Domain: Bacteria
- Kingdom: Bacillati
- Phylum: Actinomycetota
- Class: Actinomycetes
- Order: Streptomycetales
- Family: Streptomycetaceae
- Genus: Streptomyces
- Species: S. halstedii

Binomial name
- Streptomyces halstedii (Waksman and Curtis 1916) Waksman and Henrici 1948 (Approved Lists 1980)

Type strain
- ATCC 10897, ATCC 19770, BCRC 13680, CBS 508.68, CCRC 13680, CECT 3328, CGMCC 4.1358, DSM 40068, DSMZ 40068, ETH 13080, ETH 15972, HAMBI 993, HMGB B938, IAW 95, ICMP 480, IFO 12783, IFO 13274, IMET 40322, IMRU 3328, IMSNU 20216, ISP 5068, JCM 4584, KACC 20015, KCC S-0052, KCC S-0584, KCC S-0794, KCCS-0584, NBRC 12783, NBRC 13274, NCIB 9839, NCIMB 9839, NRRL B-1238, NRRL-ISP 5068, RIA 1050, RIA 79, UNIQEM 156, VKM Ac-1768, VTT E-991422, Waksman 3328, WaksmanSET 3328

Synonyms
- "Actinomyces griseolus" Waksman 1923; "Actinomyces halstedii" Waksman and Curtis 1916; Streptomyces graminofaciens Charney et al. 1953 (Approved Lists 1980); Streptomyces griseolus (Waksman 1923) Waksman and Henrici 1948 (Approved Lists 1980)

Species of bacterium

Streptomyces halstedii is a bacterium species from the genus of Streptomyces which has been isolated from deeper soil layers. Streptomyces halstedii produces magnamycin B, vicenistatin deltamycin A2, deltamycin A3, bafilomycin B1 and bafilomycin C1. Streptomyces halstedii also produces complex antifungal antibiotics like oligomycins (oligomycin A, oligomycin B, oligomycin C) and the antibiotics anisomycin and sinefungin.

== See also ==
- List of Streptomyces species
