= Dasysyrphus laticaudus =

Scientific classification
- Kingdom: Animalia
- Phylum: Arthropoda
- Class: Insecta
- Order: Diptera
- Family: Syrphidae
- Subfamily: Syrphinae
- Tribe: Syrphini
- Genus: Dasysyrphus
- Species: D. laticaudus

Binomial name
- Dasysyrphus laticaudus Curran, 1925
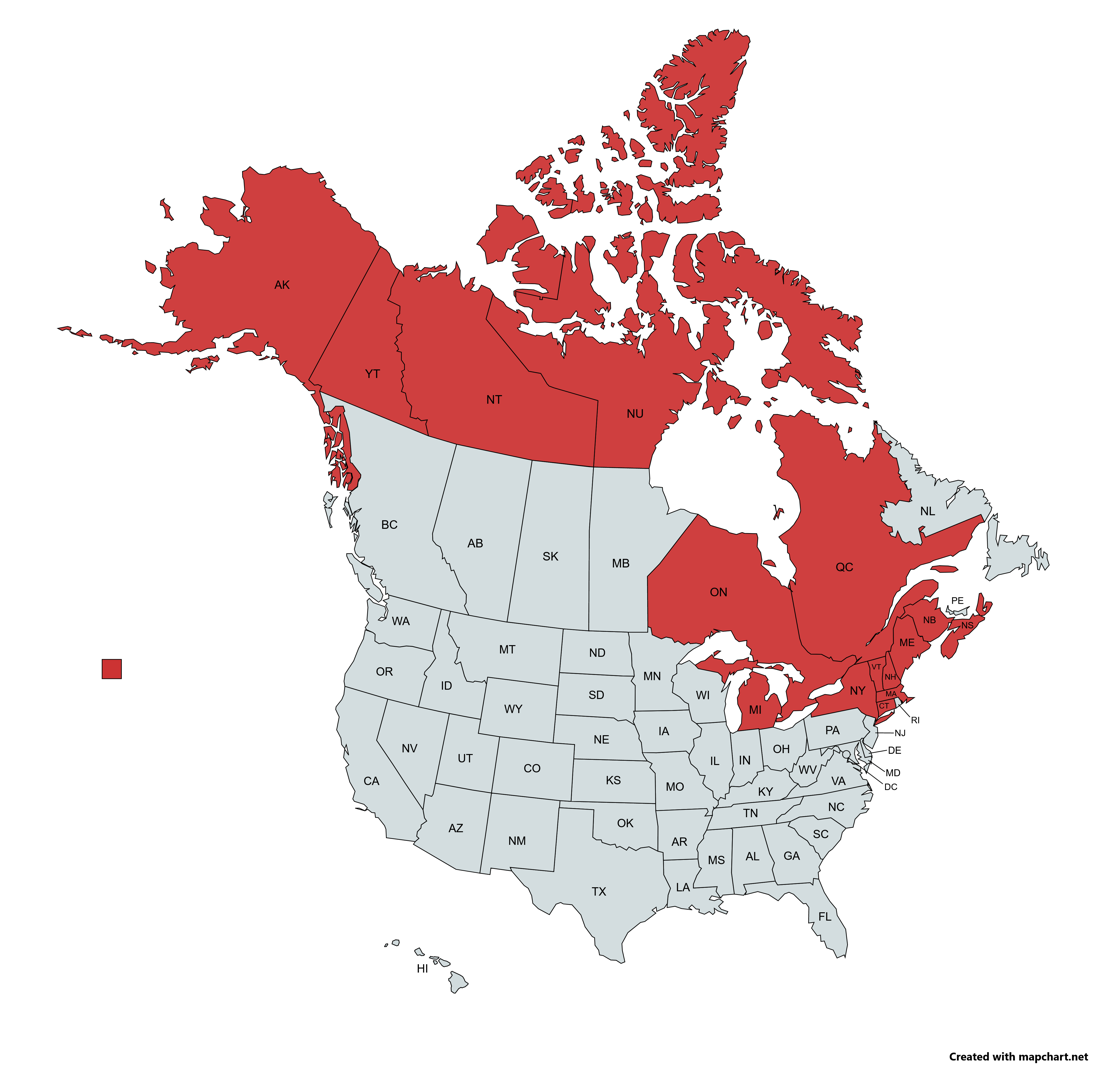
- D.laticaudus map 2023

Species of hoverfly

Dasysyrphus laticaudus (Curran 1925), the boreal conifer fly, is a common species of syrphid fly observed in Eastern and Northern North America. Hoverflies can remain nearly motionless in flight. The adults are also known as flower flies for they are commonly found on flowers, from which they get both energy-giving nectar and protein-rich pollen. The larvae of this genus are aphid predators. .

== Description ==
For terminology see Speight key to genera and glossary

"Dasysyrphus laticaudus species information and images". GBIF.

Size

5–8.2 mm (0.20–0.32 in)

Head

The frons of both males and females is dark with a light pollenose band. In males, the band runs along the ventral edge of where the eyes meet, while in females it is 1/3 to 1/2 the length between the antennae and ocelli with a separation medially and edges that are triangular to rounded. Both males and females have dark pile, while some females have light pile. . The face is light yellow, somewhat greenis in live specimens, with a dark thin stripe that is 1/4 to 1/3 the width of the face, ending before the antennae. The face has dark pile lateral to the eye, which is shorter in females. The gena is dark with light to dark pile. The scape and pedicel of the antenna are reddish yellow . The flagellomere is usually brown with a light base. The arista is pale. The eyes are pilose and touch in the male while separate in the female. The occiput is dark and covered in light pollen and pile.

Thorax

The scutum is bluish black, sometimes shiny or metallic, with pile that can range from all light to variable to all dark. The scutellum is brownish yellowish, with darker lateral edges, and the pile on the female is mostly light with some dark. The male typically has dark pile, but also some light pile anteriorly.

Wings

The wings usually have densely microtrichose cells, but there are sometimes very small bare areas in cell br, located above the spurious vein anteriorly. The haltere is light, while the pterostigma is elongate and dark.

Legs

The legs are reddish yellow, with the lower fourth of the front femora and three-fourths of the back femora, and the hind tarsi being black. The hind tibiae are mostly brownish on the upper half, and occasionally the hind tarsi are only black on the last three segments. The pile is not very dense and is mainly yellow, with black located behind the front femora.

Abdomen

The abdomen has a distinct margin. The maculae (markings) on segment 2 are large and oval, with the anterolateral edge in females reaching the edge of the segment. In males, there is a small projection but it terminates before the edge. The maculae on segments 3 and 4 are oblique, fairly straight and of uniform thickness, but they do not cross the abdominal margin. The anterolateral corner of the maculae on segment 2 in the female extends anterolaterally into a point, reaching the edge of the abdomen.
