= 5-methyltetrahydrosarcinapterin:corrinoid/iron-sulfur protein Co-methyltransferase =

Class of enzymes

Identifiers
- EC no.: 2.1.1.245

Databases
- IntEnz: IntEnz view
- BRENDA: BRENDA entry
- ExPASy: NiceZyme view
- KEGG: KEGG entry
- MetaCyc: metabolic pathway
- PRIAM: profile
- PDB structures: RCSB PDB PDBe PDBsum
Search
- PMC: articles
- PubMed: articles
- NCBI: proteins

5-methyltetrahydrosarcinapterin:corrinoid/iron-sulfur protein Co-methyltransferase (EC 2.1.1.245, cdhD (gene), cdhE (gene)) is an enzyme with systematic name 5-methyltetrahydrosarcinapterin:corrinoid/iron-sulfur protein methyltransferase. This enzyme catalyses the following chemical reaction:

[methyl-Co(III) corrinoid Fe-S protein] + tetrahydrosarcinapterin $\rightleftharpoons$ [Co(I) corrinoid Fe-S protein] + 5-methyltetrahydrosarcinapterin

This enzyme catalyses the transfer of a methyl group from the cobamide cofactor of a corrinoid/Fe-S protein to the N5 group of tetrahydrosarcinapterin.
