= Actinoplanes friuliensis =

Scientific classification
- Domain: Bacteria
- Kingdom: Bacillati
- Phylum: Actinomycetota
- Class: Actinomycetia
- Order: Micromonosporales
- Family: Micromonosporaceae
- Genus: Actinoplanes
- Species: A. friuliensis

Binomial name
- Actinoplanes friuliensis Aretz et al. 2001

Type strain
- CCUG 63250; DSM 45797; DSM 7358; HAG 10964; JCM 31203

Species of bacterium

Actinoplanes friuliensis is a species of bacteria that produces lipopeptide antibiotics with peptidoglycan synthesis-inhibiting activity, called friulimicins.
