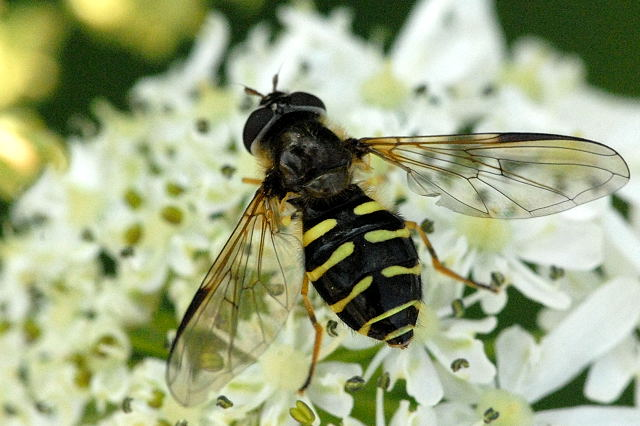
- Dasysyrphus venustus female

Scientific classification
- Kingdom: Animalia
- Phylum: Arthropoda
- Class: Insecta
- Order: Diptera
- Family: Syrphidae
- Genus: Dasysyrphus
- Species: D. venustus

Binomial name
- Dasysyrphus venustus (Meigen, 1822)

Synonyms
- Dasysyrphus arcuatus (Fallén, 1817); Dasysyrphus hilaris authors; Dasysyrphus lunulatus (Meigen, 1822); Scaeva arcuatus Fallén, 1817; Syrphus lunulatus Meigen, 1822; Syrphus venustus Meigen, 1822

= Dasysyrphus venustus =

Species of fly

Dasysyrphus venustus is a Holarctic species of hoverfly.

== Description ==
External images For terms see Morphology of Diptera
Wing length 6·25–10 mm. Eyes hairy. Tergites 3 and 4 with equal-sized yellow patterns. Tergite 2 pale pattern always present, as broad as or broader than pattern on tergites 3 and 4.Face with black longitudinal stripe. Female sternite 2 black at hind margin and dust spots on frons faint. Male genitalia are figured by Hippa (1968). The larva is figured by (Dusek and Laska (1962)

== Distribution ==
Palaearctic. Fennoscandia South to Northern Spain. Ireland eastwards through North and Central Europe. Mountains of Italy, Yugoslavia). East into European and Russian Far East and Siberia to the Pacific coast (Kuril Islands)

== Biology ==
Habitat: Fagus, Quercus and Betula woodland, alluvial deciduous forest, Pinus, Picea and Abies forest. Clearings, tracksides and arboreal, descending to visit flowers of white Umbelliferae Acer platanoides, Acer pseudoplatanus, Allium ursinum, Berberis, Caltha, Crataegus, Endymion, Euphorbia, Frangula alnus, Ilex, Lonicera xylosteum, Potentilla erecta, Prunus cerasus, Prunus spinosa, Ranunculus, Rubus idaeus, Salix, Sambucus, Sorbus aucuparia, Stellaria, Taraxacum. The flight period is April to June (later at higher altitudes and more northerly latitudes).

== Taxonomy ==
D. venustus is known to be the most frequent and widely distributed species of the genus. Studies have indicated a very high morphological and genetic variability of D. venustus, suggesting that it is a complex of species.
