= Dasysyrphus friuliensis =

Scientific classification
- Kingdom: Animalia
- Phylum: Arthropoda
- Class: Insecta
- Order: Diptera
- Family: Syrphidae
- Genus: Dasysyrphus
- Species: D. friuliensis

Binomial name
- Dasysyrphus friuliensis Goot, 1960

Species of fly

Dasysyrphus friuliensis is a European species of hoverfly.
