= L-threo-3-Methylaspartate =

l-threo-3-Methylaspartate

Names
- IUPAC name (3S)-3-Methyl-L-aspartic acid
- Systematic IUPAC name (2S,3S)-2-Amino-3-methylbutanedioic acid
- Other names l-threo-3-Methylaspartate; 3-Methylaspartic acid

Identifiers
CAS Number	6061-13-8
3D model (JSmol)	Interactive image
ChEBI	CHEBI:47980
ChemSpider	389071
KEGG	C03618
PubChem CID	440064
UNII	X72YFG5KQE
CompTox Dashboard (EPA)	DTXSID001031591
- InChI: InChI=1S/C5H9NO4/c1-2(4(7)8)3(6)5(9)10/h2-3H,6H2,1H3,(H,7,8)(H,9,10)/t2-,3-/m0/s1 Key: LXRUAYBIUSUULX-HRFVKAFMSA-N; InChI=1/C5H9NO4/c1-2(4(7)8)3(6)5(9)10/h2-3H,6H2,1H3,(H,7,8)(H,9,10)/t2-,3-/m0/s1 Key: LXRUAYBIUSUULX-HRFVKAFMBX
- SMILES: C[C@@H]([C@@H](C(=O)O)N)C(=O)O

Properties
Chemical formula	C_{5}H_{9}NO_{4}
Molar mass	147.130 g·mol^{−1}
- Except where otherwise noted, data are given for materials in their standard state (at 25 °C [77 °F], 100 kPa). Infobox references

l-threo-3-Methylaspartate is an unusual amino acid formed by glutamate mutase and can be metabolised by methylaspartate ammonia-lyase. It is found in the structures of the antibiotics friulimicin and vicenistatin and in carbon metabolism of haloarchaea (methylaspartate cycle).
