= Cobamide =

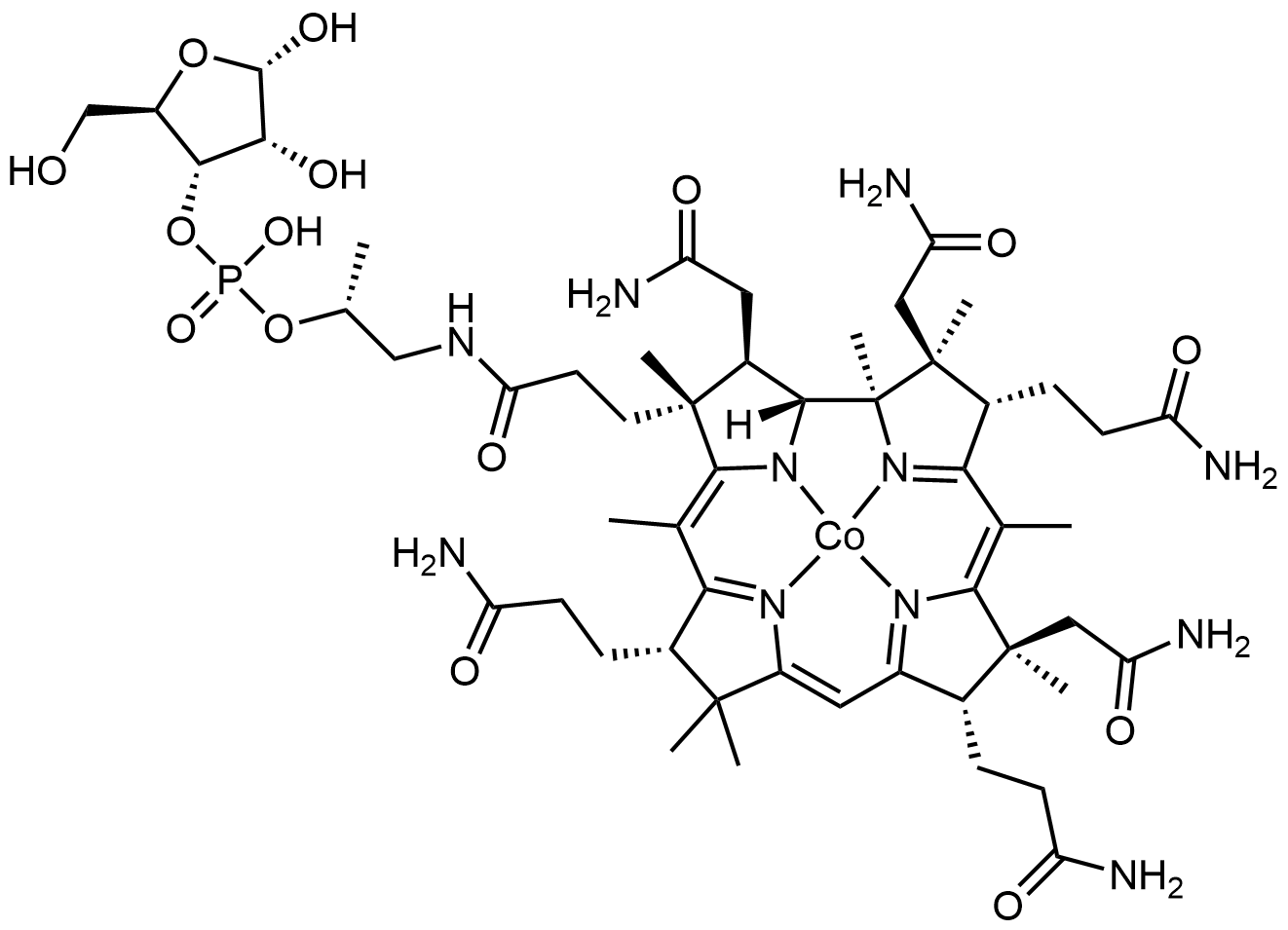

Names
- IUPAC name Cobamide
- Systematic IUPAC name Cobalt [(2R,3S,4R,5S)-4,5-dihydroxy-2-(hydroxymethyl)oxolan-3-yl] [(2R)-1-[3-[(1R,2R,3R,4Z,7S,9Z,12S,13S,14Z,17S,18S,19R)-2,13,18-tris(2-amino-2-oxoethyl)-7,12,17-tris(3-amino-3-oxopropyl)-3,5,8,8,13,15,18,19-octamethyl-2,7,12,17-tetrahydro-1H-corrin-21-id-3-yl]propanoylamino]propan-2-yl] hydrogen phosphate

Identifiers
CAS Number	14709-02-5
3D model (JSmol)	Interactive image
ChEBI	CHEBI:3796
KEGG	C00210
PubChem CID	44176389
- InChI: InChI=1S/C53H82N11O15P.Co/c1-24(78-80(75,76)79-44-32(23-65)77-48(74)43(44)73)22-60-40(72)16-17-50(6)30(18-37(57)69)47-53(9)52(8,21-39(59)71)29(12-15-36(56)68)42(64-53)26(3)46-51(7,20-38(58)70)27(10-13-34(54)66)31(61-46)19-33-49(4,5)28(11-14-35(55)67)41(62-33)25(2)45(50)63-47;/h19,24,27-30,32,43-44,47-48,65,73-74H,10-18,20-23H2,1-9H3,(H15,54,55,56,57,58,59,60,61,62,63,64,66,67,68,69,70,71,72,75,76);/p-1/t24-,27-,28-,29-,30+,32-,43-,44-,47-,48+,50-,51+,52+,53+;/m1./s1 Key: WUZNOFXZJICPCQ-NHIUFCJESA-M
- SMILES: CC1=C2C(C(C([N-]2)C3(C(C(C(=N3)C(=C4C(C(C(=N4)C=C5C(C(C1=N5)CCC(=O)N)(C)C)CCC(=O)N)(C)CC(=O)N)C)CCC(=O)N)(C)CC(=O)N)C)CC(=O)N)(C)CCC(=O)NCC(C)OP(=O)(O)OC6C(OC(C6O)O)CO.[Co]

Properties
Chemical formula	C_{53}H_{81}CoN_{11}O_{15}P
Molar mass	1202.200 g·mol^{−1}
- Except where otherwise noted, data are given for materials in their standard state (at 25 °C [77 °F], 100 kPa). Infobox references

Cobamide is a naturally occurring chemical compound containing cobalt in the corrinoid family of macrocyclic complexes. Cobamide works as a coenzyme with some enzymes in bacteria. The cobalt atom may have a transferable methyl group attached. It is used for example in 5-methyltetrahydrosarcinapterin:corrinoid/iron-sulfur protein Co-methyltransferase.
