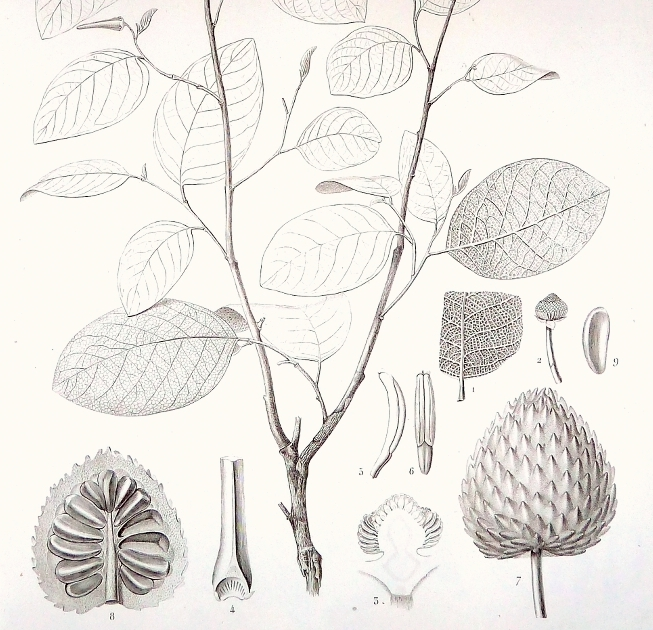
- Scientific illustration of Annona bullata

Conservation status
- Least Concern (IUCN 3.1)

Scientific classification
- Kingdom: Plantae
- Clade: Tracheophytes
- Clade: Angiosperms
- Clade: Magnoliids
- Order: Magnoliales
- Family: Annonaceae
- Genus: Annona
- Species: A. bullata

Binomial name
- Annona bullata A.Rich.

= Annona bullata =

Species of flowering plant

Annona bullata is a species of plant in the family Annonaceae. It is native to Cuba. Achille Richard, the French botanist who first formally described the species, named it after the bubbled (bullatus in Latin) appearance of the spaces between the fine network of veins in the leaves.

== Description ==
It is a tree reaching 16.5-19.5 meters in height. Its mature branches are hairless, grey-brown, and have lenticels. Its oblong leaves are 5-9 by 2.5-4.5 centimeters with blunt or pointed tips. The leaves have 12-14 pairs of secondary veins emanating from the midrib with a fine network of subsidiary veins. The subsidiary veins cause the spaces they enclose to have a bubble-like appearance on the upper surface of the leaf. The upper surfaces of the mature grey-green leaves are hairless, their undersides have rust-colored hairs. Its rust-colored petioles are 4-6 millimeters long and have a furrow on their upper surface. Its inflorescences consist of solitary flowers on peduncles that are 15-18 millimeters long. The peduncles have two bracteoles, one at their base and another at about their midpoint. The fresh buds have an elongated pyramid shape. It has two rows of petals. The outer yellow-green petals are 25-30 by 4 millimeters, concave at their base, have red woolly hairs on their outer surface and grey wooly hairs on their inner surface. The inner petals much shorter and have red wooly hairs. Its sepals are united at their base to form a calyx with 3 triangular lobes that come to a point at their tip. The calyx is densely covered with rust-colored wooly hairs. Its flowers have numerous stamens, 1.2-1.4 millimeters in length, with filaments that are 0.45 by 0.25 millimeters, and 0.8 millimeter long anthers. The tissue that connects the lobes of the anther forms a velvety cap on the anthers. Its flowers have numerous carpels that are crowded together. Its 0.8 millimeter long ovaries are covered with long soft hairs. Its oblong styles have a groove along their inner surface. It has small, hairy, heart-shaped fruit. Its bright golden seeds are 7-9 by 10-14 millimeters, smooth and have a thin shell with a wax-like surface.

=== Reproductive biology ===
The pollen of Annona bullata is shed as permanent tetrads.

=== Uses ===
In 1845 the fragrant wood was described as being used locally in Cuba as lumber because of its strength and durability. Several bioactive molecules known as acetogenins have been isolated from its bark including: bullatacin, which has pesticidal activity; bullatalicin, which is selectively cytotoxic to human tumor cells; and bullatanocinone, which highly cytotoxic to lung and colon cancer cells
