= Polyketide =

Natural organic compounds derived from a [C(O)–CH2] chain

In organic chemistry, polyketides are a class of natural products derived from a precursor molecule consisting of a chain of alternating ketone (>C=O, or its reduced forms) and methylene (>CH_{2}) groups: [−C(=O)−CH_{2}−]_{n}. First studied in the early 20th century, discovery, biosynthesis, and application of polyketides has evolved. It is a large and diverse group of secondary metabolites caused by its complex biosynthesis which resembles that of fatty acid synthesis. Because of this diversity, polyketides can have various medicinal, agricultural, and industrial applications. Many polyketides are medicinal or exhibit acute toxicity. Biotechnology has enabled discovery of more naturally occurring polyketides and evolution of new polyketides with novel or improved bioactivity.

== History ==
Naturally produced polyketides by various plants and organisms have been used by humans since before studies on them began in the 19th and 20th century. In 1893, J. Norman Collie synthesized detectable amounts of orcinol by heating dehydracetic acid with barium hydroxide causing the pyrone ring to open into a triketide. Further studies in 1903 by Collie on the triketone polyketide intermediate noted the condensation occurring amongst compounds with multiple keten groups coining the term polyketides.

Biosynthesis of orsellinic acid from polyketide intermediate.

It wasn't until 1955 that the biosynthesis of polyketides were understood. Arthur Birch used radioisotope labeling of carbon in acetate to trace the biosynthesis of 2-hydroxy-6-methylbenzoic acid in Penicillium patulum and demonstrate the head-to-tail linkage of acetic acids to form the polyketide. In the 1980s and 1990s, advancements in genetics allowed for isolation of the genes associated to polyketides to understand the biosynthesis.

== Discovery ==
Polyketides can be produced in bacteria, fungi, plants, and certain marine organisms. Earlier discovery of naturally occurring polyketides involved the isolation of the compounds being produced by the specific organism using organic chemistry purification methods based on bioactivity screens. Later technology allowed for the isolation of the genes and heterologous expression of the genes to understand the biosynthesis. In addition, further advancements in biotechnology have allowed for the use of metagenomics and genome mining to find new polyketides using similar enzymes to known polyketides.

== Biosynthesis ==
Polyketides are synthesized by multienzyme polypeptides that resemble eukaryotic fatty acid synthase but are often much larger. They include acyl-carrier domains plus an assortment of enzymatic units that can function in an iterative fashion, repeating the same elongation/modification steps (as in fatty acid synthesis), or in a sequential fashion so as to generate more heterogeneous types of polyketides.

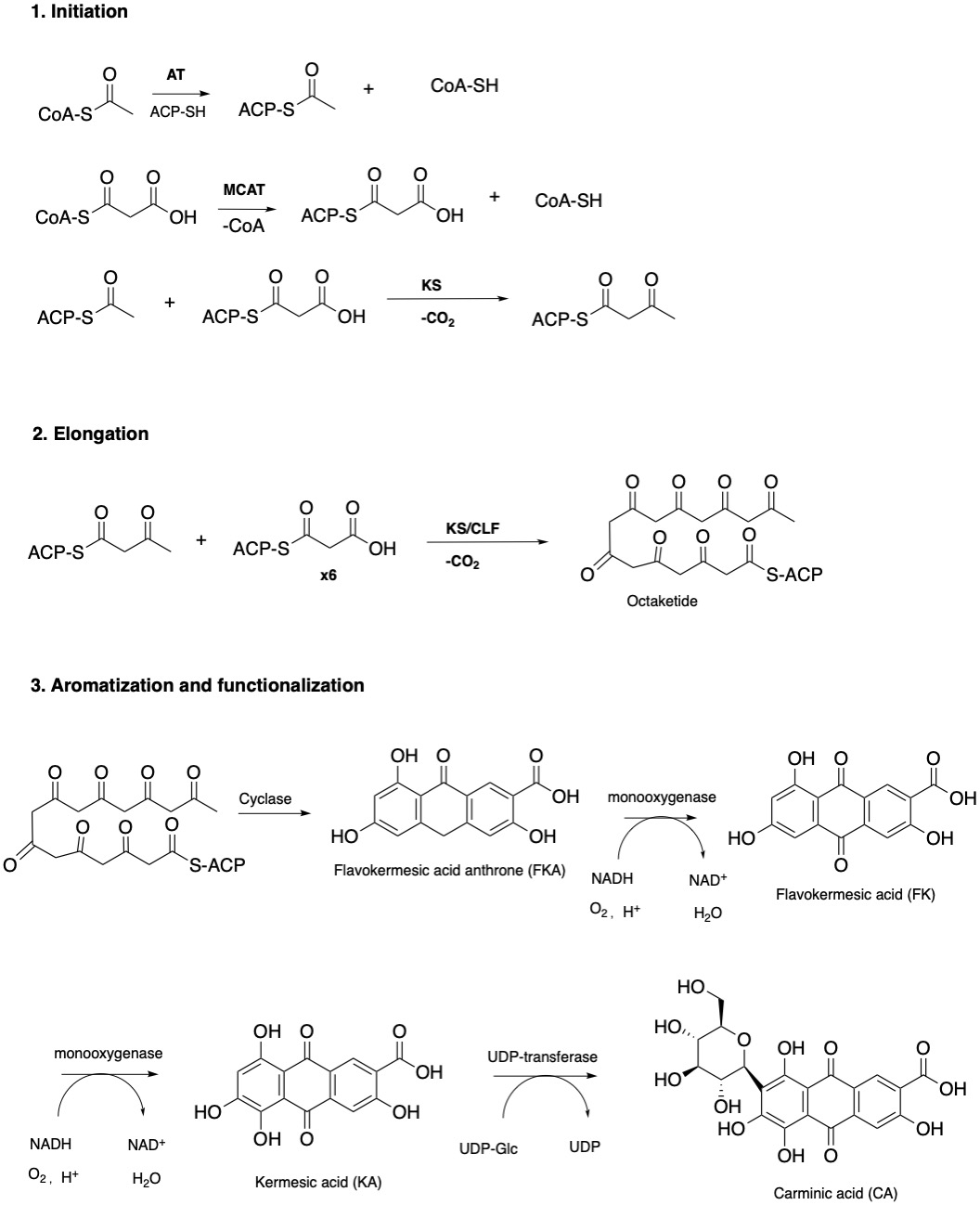
Biosynthesis of carminic acid

=== Polyketide synthase ===
Polyketides are produced by polyketide synthases (PKSs). The core biosynthesis involves stepwise condensation of a starter unit (typically acetyl-CoA or propionyl-CoA) with an extender unit (either malonyl-CoA or methylmalonyl-CoA). The condensation reaction is accompanied by the decarboxylation of the extender unit, yielding a beta-keto functional group and releasing a carbon dioxide. The first condensation yields an acetoacetyl group, a diketide. Subsequent condensations yield triketides, tetraketide, etc. Other starter units attached to a coenzyme A include isobutyrate, cyclohexanecarboxylate, malonate, and benzoate.

PKSs are multi-domain enzymes or enzyme complex consisting of various domains. The polyketide chains produced by a minimal polyketide synthase (consisting of a acyltransferase and ketosynthase for the stepwise condensation of the starter unit and extender units) are almost invariably modified. Each polyketide synthases is unique to each polyketide chain because they contain different combinations of domains that reduce the carbonyl group to a hydroxyl (via a ketoreductase), an olefin (via a dehydratase), or a methylene (via an enoylreductase).

Termination of the polyketide scaffold biosynthesis can also vary. It is sometimes accompanied by a thioesterase that releases the polyketide via hydrating the thioester linkage (as in fatty acid synthesis) creating a linear polyketide scaffold. However, if water is not able to reach the active site, the hydrating reaction will not occur and an intramolecular reaction is more probable creating a macrocyclic polyketide. Another possibility is spontaneous hydrolysis without the aid of a thioesterase.

=== Post-tailoring enzymes ===
Further possible modifications to the polyketide scaffolds can be made. This can include glycosylation via a glucosyltransferase or oxidation via a monooxygenase. Similarly, cyclization and aromatization can be introduced via a cyclase, sometimes proceeded by the enol tautomers of the polyketide. These enzymes are not part of the domains of the polyketide synthase. Instead, they are found in gene clusters in the genome close to the polyketide synthase genes.

== Classification ==
Polyketides are a structurally diverse family. There are various subclasses of polyketides including: aromatics, macrolactones/macrolides, decalin ring containing, polyether, and polyenes.

Polyketide synthases are also broadly divided into three classes: Type I PKSs (multimodular megasynthases that are non-iterative, often producing macrolides, polyethers, and polyenes), Type II PKSs (dissociated enzymes with iterative action, often producing aromatics), and Type III PKSs (chalcone synthase-like, producing small aromatic molecules).

In addition to these subclasses, there also exist polyketides that are hybridized with nonribosomal peptides (Hybrid NRP-PK and PK-NRP). Since nonribosomal peptide assembly lines use carrier proteins similar to those use in polyketide synthases, convergence of the two systems evolved to form hybrids, resulting in polypeptides with nitrogen in the skeletal structure and complex function groups similar to those found in amino acids.

== Applications ==
Polyketide antibiotics, antifungals, cytostatics, anticholesteremic, antiparasitics, coccidiostats, animal growth promoters and natural insecticides are in commercial use.

=== Medicinal ===
There are more than 10,000 known polyketides, 1% of which are known to have potential for drug activity. Polyketides comprise 20% of the top-selling pharmaceuticals with combined worldwide revenues of over USD 18 billion per year.

Polyketides
Geldanamycin, an antibiotic.	Doxycycline, an antibiotic.	Erythromycin, an antibiotic.	Aflatoxin B1 known carcinogenic compound.

==== Examples ====
- Macrolides
  - Pikromycin, the first isolated macrolide (1950)
  - The antibiotics erythromycin A, clarithromycin, and azithromycin
  - The antihelminthics ivermectin
- Ansamycins
  - The antitumor agents geldanamycin and macbecin,
  - The antibiotic rifamycin
- Polyenes
  - The antifungals amphotericin, nystatin and pimaricin
- Polyethers
  - The antibiotic monensin
- Tetracyclines
  - The antibiotic agent doxycycline
- Acetogenins
  - bullatacin
  - squamocin
  - molvizarin
  - uvaricin
  - annonacin
- Others
  - The immunosuppressants tacrolimus (FK506) (a calcineurin inhibitor) and sirolimus (rapamycin) (a mTOR inhibitor)
  - Radicicol and the pochonin family (HSP90 inhibitors)
  - The cholesterol lowering agent lovastatin
  - Discodermolide
  - Aflatoxin
  - Usnic acid
  - Anthracimycin
  - Anthramycin
  - Olivetolic acid (intermediate in cannabinoid pathways)
  - Colibactin, a genotoxin produced by some intestinal bacteria

=== Agricultural ===
Polyketides can be used for crop protection as pesticides.

==== Examples ====
- Pesticides
  - spinosad or spinosyn (an insecticide)
  - avermectin
  - polynactins
  - tetramycin

=== Industrial ===
Polyketides can be used for industrial purposes, such as pigmentation and dietary flavonoids.

==== Examples ====
- Pigments
  - azaphilones
  - hydroxyanthraquinones
  - naphthoquinones
- Flavonoids
  - curcumin
  - silymarin
  - daidzein

== Biotechnology ==
Protein engineering has opened avenues for creating polyketides not found in nature. For example, the modular nature of PKSs allows for domains to be replaced, added or deleted. Introducing diversity in assembly lines enables the discovery of new polyketides with increased bioactivity or new bioactivity.

Furthermore, the use of genome mining allows for discovery of new natural polyketides and their assembly lines.

== See also ==
- Esterase
- Nonribosomal peptide
- ThYme (database) (2010)
