= Chlorotonil A =

Polyketide product

Names
- IUPAC name (1S,2R,3Z,5E,7S,10S,14R,15R,16S,20S)-12,12-dichloro-2,7,10,16,18-pentamethyl-8-oxatricyclo[12.8.0.0^{15,20}]docosa-3,5,17,21-tetraene-9,11,13-trione

Identifiers
CAS Number	1009813-26-6
3D model (JSmol)	Interactive image
ChEMBL	ChEMBL4290170
ChemSpider	28284718
PubChem CID	24742044
CompTox Dashboard (EPA)	DTXSID401043833
- InChI: InChI=1S/C26H32Cl2O4/c1-14-12-16(3)21-19(13-14)10-11-20-15(2)8-6-7-9-17(4)32-25(31)18(5)23(29)26(27,28)24(30)22(20)21/h6-12,15-22H,13H2,1-5H3/b8-6-,9-7+/t15-,16-,17+,18+,19-,20+,21-,22-/m1/s1 Key: RQYZFUUTQJMTMJ-JCSZEPHKSA-N
- SMILES: C[C@@H]1/C=C\C=C\[C@@H](OC(=O)[C@H](C(=O)C(C(=O)[C@@H]2[C@H]1C=C[C@H]3[C@H]2[C@@H](C=C(C3)C)C)(Cl)Cl)C)C

Properties
Chemical formula	C_{26}H_{32}Cl_{2}O_{4}
Molar mass	479.436 g·mol−1
- Except where otherwise noted, data are given for materials in their standard state (at 25 °C [77 °F], 100 kPa). Infobox references

Chlorotonil A is a polyketide natural product produced by the myxobacterium Sorangium cellulosum So ce1525. It displays antimalarial activity in an animal model, and has in vitro antibacterial and antifungal activity. The activity of chlorotonil A has been attributed to the gem-dichloro-1,3-dione moiety, which is a unique functionality in polyketides. In addition to its unique halogenation, the structure of chlorotonil A has also garnered interest due to its similarity to anthracimycin, a polyketide natural product with antibiotic activity against Gram-positive bacteria. Recently, structure-optimization resulted in semi-synthetic derivatives ChB1-Epo2 and Dehalogenil, molecules with significantly improved physicochemical properties.

== Biosynthesis ==
Chlorotonil A is synthesized from a type I modular polyketide synthase (PKS). This gene cluster does not have any acyltransferase (AT) domains, indicating that it is a trans-AT PKS; in these systems, there is a tandem-AT domain that loads the extender subunits onto the acyl carrier protein (ACP) and checks the intermediates, rather than individual AT domains in each module. The gene cluster of chlorotonil A is organized so that the initiator, acetyl-CoA, is loaded onto the tandem-AT domain, then is iteratively elongated with malonyl-CoA units to construct the macrolactone backbone. At modules 3 and 7, a double bond shift occurs in the elongation module to allow for the β,γ-unsaturation and α-methylation. There is a spontaneous, non-enzymatic intramolecular Diels-Alder-like [4+2] cycloaddition at module 8 to furnish the decalin motif.

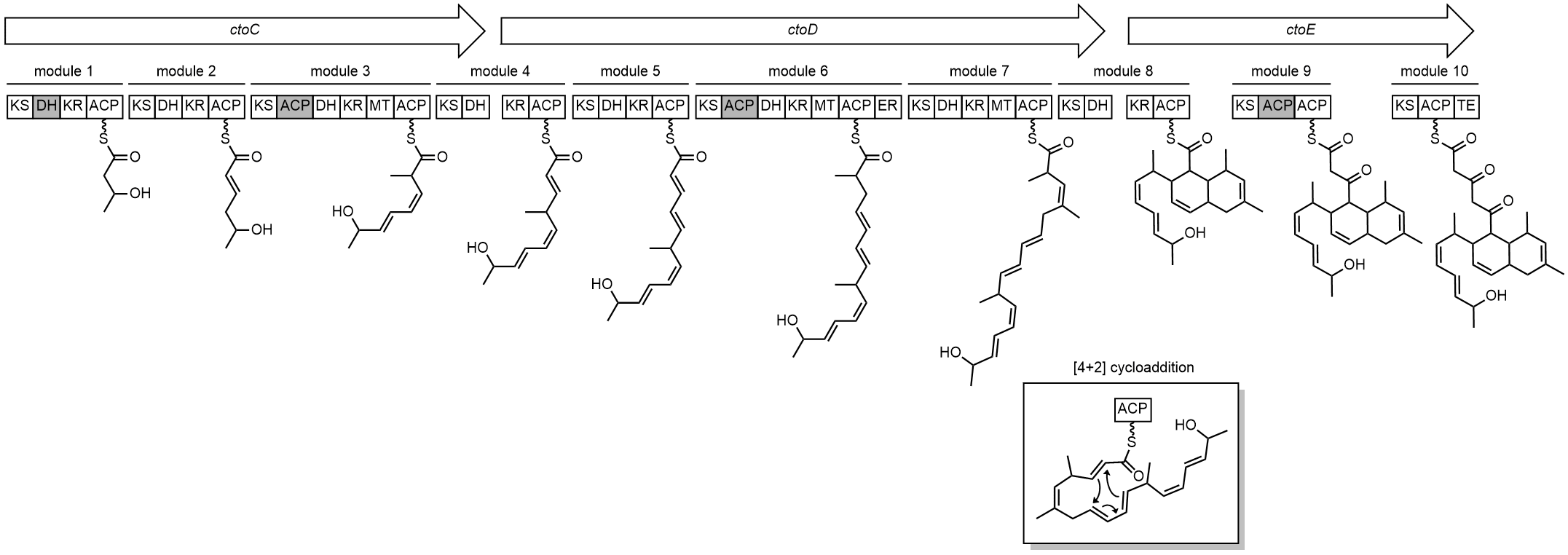
PKS architecture of chlorotonil A. Squares represent the enzymatic domains: KS, ketosynthase; DH, dehydratase; ACP, acyl carrier protein; KR, keto reductase; MT, methyl transferase; ER, enoyl reductase; TE, thioesterase. Inactive domains are shaded in grey.

Following macrolactonization by the thioesterase domain of module 10, the premature chlorotonil A core is chlorinated twice by CtoA, a flavin-dependent halogenase. The halogenated core is then methylated by the standalone SAM-dependent methyltransferase CtoF to yield chlorotonil A.

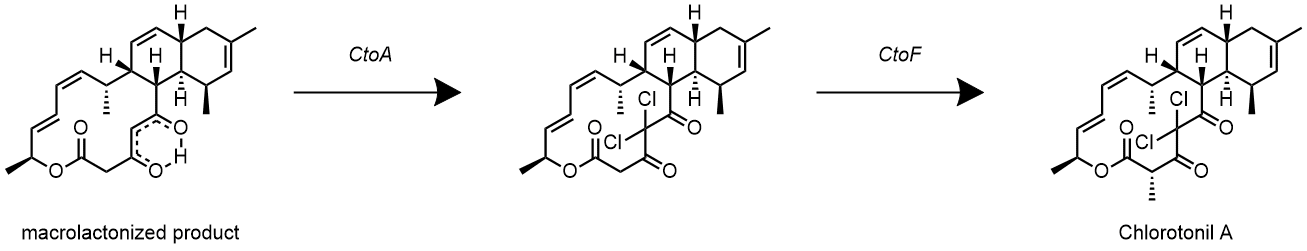
Halogenation and methylation of the post-PKS macrolactonized core of chlorotonil A

== See also ==
- Myxobacteria
