= Stenoma leucana =

Scientific classification
- Domain: Eukaryota
- Kingdom: Animalia
- Phylum: Arthropoda
- Class: Insecta
- Order: Lepidoptera
- Family: Depressariidae
- Genus: Stenoma
- Species: S. leucana

Binomial name
- Stenoma leucana (Sepp, [1844])

Synonyms
- Phalaena (Tortrices) leucana Sepp, [1844]; Cryptolechia tenera Zeller, 1854; Cryptolechia virginalis Butler, 1877; Stenoma neanica Walsingham, 1913

Species of moth

Stenoma leucana is a moth in the family Depressariidae. It was described by Jan Sepp in 1844. It is found in Venezuela, Suriname, French Guiana, Brazil (Amazonas, Pará, Santa Catarina), Bolivia, Panama and Mexico.

The wingspan is 15–17 mm. The forewings are shining white. The hindwings are shining white, with a brownish-brassy tinge toward the apex.

The larvae have been reported skeletonising the upperside of the leaves of Annona muricata. The larvae are white, with conspicuous single white hairs, and with three longitudinal black stripes, the dorsal less conspicuous than the broader lateral stripes. The head and thorax are black, with four transverse ochreous triangular spots, the apices of each pair meeting above.
