= Streptomyces resistomycificus =

Scientific classification
- Domain: Bacteria
- Kingdom: Bacillati
- Phylum: Actinomycetota
- Class: Actinomycetes
- Order: Streptomycetales
- Family: Streptomycetaceae
- Genus: Streptomyces
- Species: S. resistomycificus

Binomial name
- Streptomyces resistomycificus Lindenbein 1952

Type strain
- ATCC 19804, BCRC 13755, CBS 556.68, CCRC 13755, DSM 40133

Species of bacterium

Streptomyces resistomycificus is a bacterium species from the genus of Streptomyces which has been isolated from soil. Streptomyces resistomycificus produces the pentacyclic polyketide resistomycin.

== See also ==
- List of Streptomyces species
