= Streptomyces canus =

Scientific classification
- Domain: Bacteria
- Kingdom: Bacillati
- Phylum: Actinomycetota
- Class: Actinomycetia
- Order: Streptomycetales
- Family: Streptomycetaceae
- Genus: Streptomyces
- Species: S. canus

Binomial name
- Streptomyces canus Heinemann et al. 1953 (Approved Lists 1980)

Type strain
- 456786 (A6786), ATCC 12237, ATCC 19737, BCRC 13652, Bristol Labs 456786, CBS 475.68, CCRC 13652, CGMCC 4.1468, DSM 40017, ETH 28550, ETH 31559, IFM 1092, IFO 12752, IFO 5017, ISP 5017, JCM 4212, JCM 4569, KCC S-0212, KCC S-0569, KCCS-0212, KCCS-0569, Lanoot R-8691, LMG 19329, NBRC 12752, NCIB 9627, NCIB 9801, NCIMB 9627, NRRL B-1989, NRRL B-398, NRRL-ISP 5017, PSA 103, R-8691, RIA 1017, UNIQEM 125, VKM Ac-1011

Synonyms
- Streptomyces ciscaucasicus Sveshnikova 1986

Species of bacterium

Streptomyces canus is a bacterium species from the genus of Streptomyces which has been isolated from soil in the US. Streptomyces canus produces resistomycin, tetracenomycin D, amphomycin, aspartocin D and aspartocin E.

== See also ==
- List of Streptomyces species
