= Prescopranone =

Names
- IUPAC name (E)-3-ethyl-5-(2-ethylbutyl)-4-hydroxy-6-(pent-2-en-3-yl)-2H-pyran-2-one

Identifiers
3D model (JSmol)	Interactive image
- InChI: InChI=1S/C18H28O3/c1-6-12(7-2)11-15-16(19)14(10-5)18(20)21-17(15)13(8-3)9-4/h8,12,19H,6-7,9-11H2,1-5H3/b13-8+ Key: ZVDIOGOMGZQPPP-MDWZMJQESA-N
- SMILES: CCC1=C(O)C(=C(OC1=O)C(/CC)=C/C)CC(CC)CC

Properties
Chemical formula	C_{18}H_{28}O_{3}
Molar mass	292.419 g·mol^{−1}
Appearance	Pale yellow oil
- Except where otherwise noted, data are given for materials in their standard state (at 25 °C [77 °F], 100 kPa). Infobox references

Prescopranone is a key intermediate in the biosynthesis of scopranones. Prescopranone is the precursor to scopranone A, scopranone B, and scopranone C, which are produced by Streptomyces sp. BYK-11038.

== Biosynthesis ==
Prescopranone biosynthesis - Type I PKS scheme

The biosynthesis of prescopranone follows the module structure of a Type I polyketide synthase (PKS) with three elongation modules and a lactonizing thioesterase domain. Genome mining of Streptomyces sp. BYK identified a scopranone biosynthetic gene cluster containing 3 genes, sprA, sprB, and sprC, that encode modular PKSs.

A starter acyl carrier protein is loaded with malonyl-CoA, and decarboxylated by a ketosynthase (KS^{Q}). The starter unit is then transferred to module 1, which elongates the polyketide chain with ethyl malonyl-CoA. The tailoring domain of this module reduces the β-carbonyl to an alkene. Module 2 elongates the polyketide with ethylbutyl-malonyl-CoA. Finally, module 3 elongates the polyketide chain with ethyl malonyl-CoA, and is released upon the lactonization of the polyketide product by a thioesterase domain. Following the cyclization and release of the polyketide, the product undergoes a keto-enol tautomerism to form prescopranone. Both modules 2 and 3 contain dysfunctional ketoreductase (KR) domains, which do not reduce the β-carbonyl due to missing NAD(P)H binding motifs and tyrosine residues in their active sites. Prescopranone undergoes post-PKS transformations to form scopranones. Additionally, the deletion of a downstream gene sprT can disrupt biosynthesis of scopranones in Streptomyces avermitilis SUKA54. The products of this mutated pathway have yet to be elucidated.

== Research ==
Prescopranone and similar compounds are currently being investigated as bone morphogenetic protein (BMP) inhibitors for the treatment of fibrodysplasia ossificans progressiva (FOP).
