= Annonin =

Annonins are a group of chemical compounds classified as acetogenins. They are found in the extracts of Annona seeds (A. squamosa and A. muricata). Annonin-based bioinsecticides are used to control Coleoptera (beetle) pests commonly found in stored organic cereal and beans in the country of Brazil. Other different types of annonin-based insecticides, derived from A. mucosa, fight off lepidopteran (moth) pests that infest cabbage leaves, also found in the tropical climates of Brazil. The benefit of using these bioinsecticides is their relatively low cost and no phytotoxicity. These annonin molecules act as overpowering inhibitors of complex I (NADH: ubiquinone oxidoreductase) in the electron-transport chain in the mitochondria of quarry pests. In cell membranes of these same pests, annonins also inhibit coenzyme NADH, causing these arthropods to die.

Chemical structure of annonin I
