= Amphomycin =

Names
- Other names Amfomycinum, Anfomicina

Identifiers
CAS Number	1402-82-0
3D model (JSmol)	Interactive image
ChemSpider	32702413
DrugBank	DB11499
ECHA InfoCard	100.014.327
EC Number	215-760-0
KEGG	D02927
PubChem CID	91663250
UNII	4P63B997RT
CompTox Dashboard (EPA)	DTXSID101017657
- InChI: InChI=1S/C58H91N13O20/c1-8-30(4)18-13-11-9-10-12-14-21-39(72)63-36(26-44(79)80)51(83)68-46(31(5)58(90)91)54(86)65-35(25-43(77)78)50(82)60-27-40(73)64-34(24-42(75)76)49(81)61-28-41(74)66-47(32(6)59)55(87)67-45(29(2)3)56(88)71-23-17-20-38(71)52(84)62-33(7)48-57(89)70-22-16-15-19-37(70)53(85)69-48/h12,14,29-38,45-48H,8-11,13,15-28,59H2,1-7H3,(H,60,82)(H,61,81)(H,62,84)(H,63,72)(H,64,73)(H,65,86)(H,66,74)(H,67,87)(H,68,83)(H,69,85)(H,75,76)(H,77,78)(H,79,80)(H,90,91)/b14-12+/t30?,31-,32+,33+,34+,35+,36+,37-,38+,45+,46+,47-,48+/m1/s1 Key: XBNDESPXQUOOBQ-LSMLZNGOSA-N
- SMILES: CCC(C)CCCCC/C=C/CC(=O)N[C@@H](CC(=O)O)C(=O)N[C@@H]([C@@H](C)C(=O)O)C(=O)N[C@@H](CC(=O)O)C(=O)NCC(=O)N[C@@H](CC(=O)O)C(=O)NCC(=O)N[C@H]([C@H](C)N)C(=O)N[C@@H](C(C)C)C(=O)N1CCC[C@H]1C(=O)N[C@@H](C)[C@H]2C(=O)N3CCCC[C@@H]3C(=O)N2

Properties
Chemical formula	C_{58}H_{91}N_{13}O_{20}
Molar mass	1290.437 g·mol^{−1}
- Except where otherwise noted, data are given for materials in their standard state (at 25 °C [77 °F], 100 kPa). Infobox references

Amphomycin is an antibiotic with the molecular formula C_{58}H_{91}N_{13}O_{20} which is produced by the bacterium Streptomyces canus.
