= Molvizarin =

Names
- IUPAC name (2S)-4-[(2R,11R)-2,11-Dihydroxy-11-[(2R,5R)-5-[(2R,5R)-5-[(1S)-1-hydroxyundecyl]oxolan-2-yl]oxolan-2-yl]undecyl]-2-methyl-2H-furan-5-one

Identifiers
CAS Number	138551-26-5
3D model (JSmol)	Interactive image
ChEMBL	ChEMBL110333
ChemSpider	23193544
PubChem CID	44337885
- InChI: InChI=1S/C35H62O7/c1-3-4-5-6-7-8-12-15-18-29(37)31-20-22-33(41-31)34-23-21-32(42-34)30(38)19-16-13-10-9-11-14-17-28(36)25-27-24-26(2)40-35(27)39/h24,26,28-34,36-38H,3-23,25H2,1-2H3/t26-,28+,29-,30+,31+,32+,33+,34+/m0/s1 Key: YVZIPERWMPDEIZ-XDBACSEOSA-N
- SMILES: CCCCCCCCCC[C@@H]([C@H]1CC[C@@H](O1)[C@H]2CC[C@@H](O2)[C@@H](CCCCCCCC[C@H](CC3=C[C@@H](OC3=O)C)O)O)O

Properties
Chemical formula	C_{35}H_{62}O_{7}
Molar mass	594.874 g·mol^{−1}
- Except where otherwise noted, data are given for materials in their standard state (at 25 °C [77 °F], 100 kPa). Infobox references

Molvizarin is a cytotoxic acetogenin derivate with the molecular formula C_{35}H_{62}O_{7} which has been isolated from the bark of the plant Annona cherimolia. Molvizarin has in vitro activity against tumor cells.
