= Annonamine =

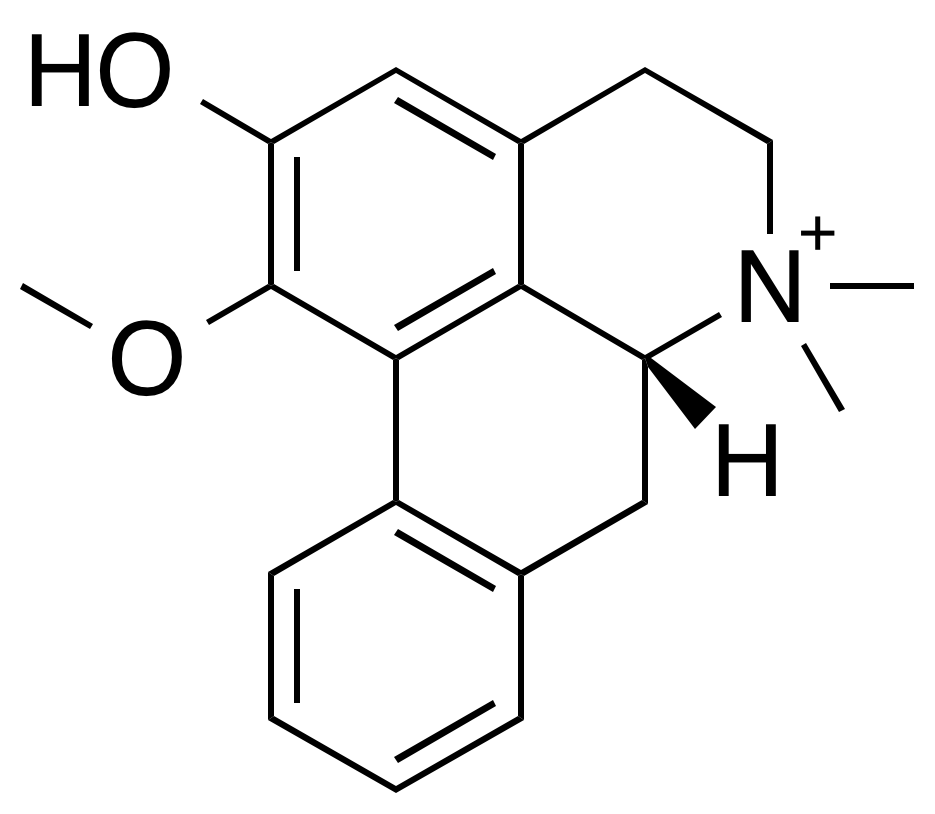

Names
- Preferred IUPAC name (6aR)-2-Hydroxy-1-methoxy-6,6-dimethyl-5,6,6a,7-tetrahydro-4H-dibenzo[de,g]quinolin-6-ium

Identifiers
CAS Number	1404308-11-7
3D model (JSmol)	Interactive image
ChemSpider	28289744
PubChem CID	56929881
UNII	A6SLN2BW4T
CompTox Dashboard (EPA)	DTXSID701045614
- InChI: InChI=1S/C19H21NO2/c1-20(2)9-8-13-11-16(21)19(22-3)18-14-7-5-4-6-12(14)10-15(20)17(13)18/h4-7,11,15H,8-10H2,1-3H3/p+1/t15-/m1/s1 Key: WWSQXPANNACSIL-OAHLLOKOSA-O; InChI=1S/C19H21NO2/c1-20(2)9-8-13-11-16(21)19(22-3)18-14-7-5-4-6-12(14)10-15(20)17(13)18/h4-7,11,15H,8-10H2,1-3H3/p+1/t15-/m1/s1 Key: WWSQXPANNACSIL-XRLFSOBABS
- SMILES: C[N+]1(C)CCC2=CC(O)=C(OC)C3=C2[C@H]1CC4=C3C=CC=C4

Properties
Chemical formula	C_{19}H_{22}NO_{2}
Molar mass	296.390 g·mol^{−1}
- Except where otherwise noted, data are given for materials in their standard state (at 25 °C [77 °F], 100 kPa). Infobox references

Annonamine is a benzylisoquinoline alkaloid isolated from Annona muricata (commonly known as soursop, graviola, guanabana, paw-paw and sirsak), a plant commonly used in folk medicine by indigenous communities in Africa and South America. Structurally, it contains an aporphine core featuring a quaternary ammonium group.

== See also ==
- Asimilobine - amine not quaternized
- Anonaine
- Pukateine
