= Acetogenin =

Group of chemical compounds

Chemical structure of annonacin

Acetogenins are a class of polyketide natural products found in plants of the family Annonaceae. They are characterized by linear 32- or 34-carbon chains containing oxygenated functional groups including hydroxyls, ketones, epoxides, tetrahydrofurans and tetrahydropyrans. They are often terminated with a lactone or butenolide. Over 400 members of this family of compounds have been isolated from 51 different species of plants. Many acetogenins are characterized by neurotoxicity.

Examples include:

- Annonacin
- Annonins
- Bullatacin
- Uvaricin

== Structure ==
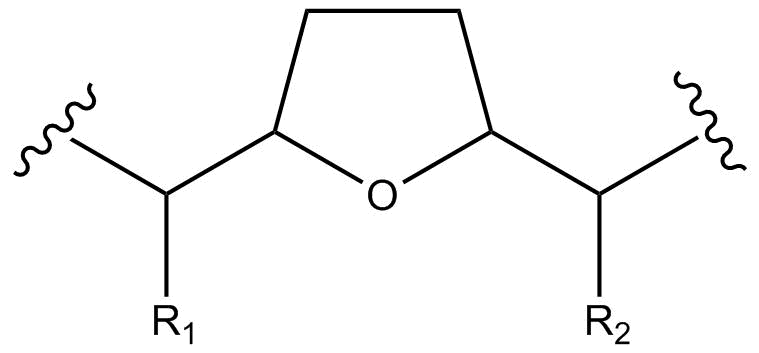
Acetogenin core unit (mono-THF)

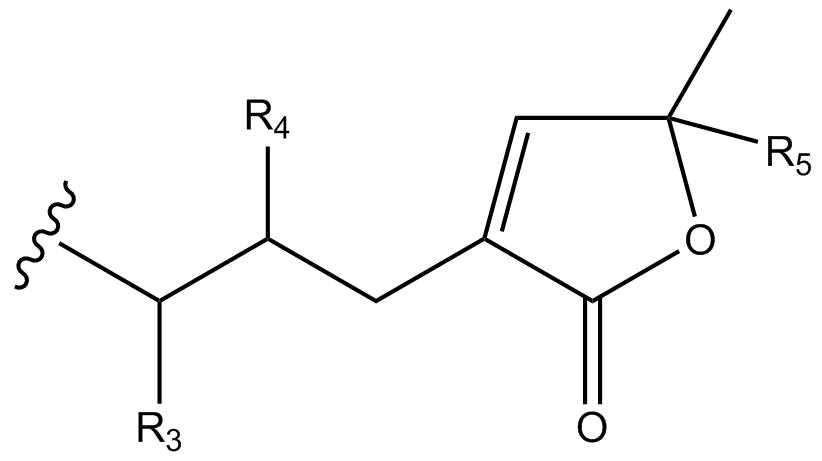
Acetogenin terminal lactone ring core unit (unsaturated)

Structurally, acetogenins are a series of C-35/C-37 compounds usually characterized by a long aliphatic chain bearing a terminal methyl-substituted α,β-unsaturated γ-lactone ring, as well as one to three tetrahydrofuran (THF) rings. These THF rings are located along the hydrocarbon chain, along with a number of oxygenated moieties (hydroxyls, acetoxyls, ketones, epoxides) and/or double bonds.

Examples of R-groups for selected acetogenins
Compound	R1	R2	R3	R4	R5
4-deoxyannoreticuin	OH	OH	H	H	H
Annonacin	OH	OH	H	OH	H
Annopentocin A	OH	H	H	OH	H
Dispalin	OAc	OH	H	OH	H
Donnaienin C	OH	OH	H	OAc	OH
Goniotetracin	OH	OH	H	OH	H
Muricoreacin	OH	H	H	OH	H
Tonkinin A	OH	OH	O	H	H
Uvaribonone	OH	OAc	O	H	H

== Research ==
Acetogenins have been investigated for their biological properties, but are a concern due to neurotoxicity. Purified acetogenins and crude extracts of the common North American pawpaw (Asimina triloba) or the soursop (Annona muricata) remain under laboratory studies.

== Mechanism of action ==
Acetogenins inhibit NADH dehydrogenase, a key enzyme in energy metabolism, disrupting mitochondrial function cumulatively.
