= Genome mining =

Research process

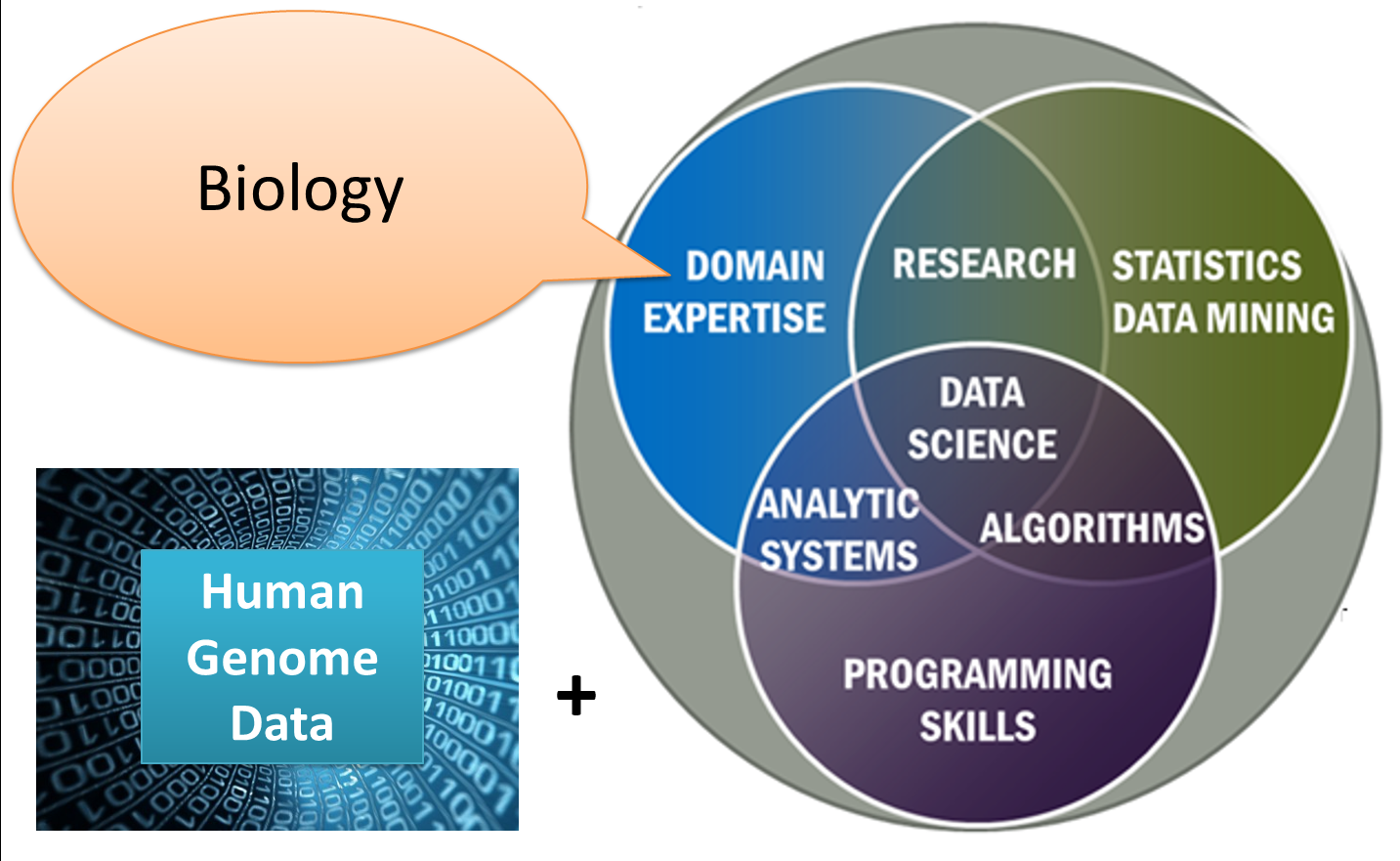
Genome mining is associated with bioinformatics investigations.

Genome mining describes the exploitation of genomic information for the discovery of biosynthetic pathways of natural products and their possible interactions. It depends on computational technology and bioinformatics tools. The mining process relies on a huge amount of data (represented by DNA sequences and annotations) accessible in genomic databases. By applying data mining algorithms, the data can be used to generate new knowledge in several areas of medicinal chemistry, such as discovering novel natural products.

== History ==
In the mid- to late 1980s, researchers have increasingly focused on genetic studies with the advancing sequencing technologies. The GenBank database was established in 1982 for the collection, management, storage, and distribution of DNA sequence data due to the increasing availability of DNA sequences. With the increasing number of genetic data, biotechnological companies have been able to use human DNA sequence to develop protein and antibody drugs through genome mining since 1992. In the late 1990s, many companies, such as Amgen, Immunec, Genentech were able to develop drugs that progressed to the clinical stage by adopting genome mining. Since the Human Genome Project was completed in the early 2000, researchers have been sequencing the genomes of many microorganisms. Subsequently, many of these genomes have been carefully studied to identify new genes and biosynthetic pathways.

== Algorithms ==
As large quantities of genomic sequence data began to accumulate in public databases, genetic algorithms became important to decipher the enormous collection of genomic data. They are commonly used to generate high-quality solutions to optimization and search problems by relying on bio-inspired operators such as mutation, crossover and selection. The followings are commonly used genetic algorithms:

- AntiSMASH (Antibiotics and Secondary Metabolite Analysis Shell) addresses secondary metabolite genome pipelines.
- BiGSCAPE Large-scale network analysis and classification of Biosynthetic Gene Clusters.
- PRISM (Prediction Informatics for Secondary Metabolites) is a combinatorial approach to chemical structure prediction for genetically encoded nonribosomal peptides and type I and II polyketides.
- SIM (Statistically based sequence similarity) method, such as FASTA or PSI-BLAST, infer orthologous homology.
- BLAST (Basic local alignment search tool) is an approach for rapid sequence comparison.

== Applications ==
Genome mining applies on the discovery of natural product by facilitating the characterization of novel molecules and biosynthetic pathways.

=== Natural product discovery ===
The production of natural products is regulated by the biosynthetic gene clusters (BGCs) encoded in the microorganism. By adopting genome mining, the BGCs that produce the target natural product can be predicted. Some important enzymes responsible for the formation of natural products are polyketide synthases (PKS), non-ribosomal peptide synthases (NRPS), ribosomally and post-translationally modified peptides (RiPPs), and terpenoids, and many more. Mining for enzymes, researchers can figure out the classes that BGCs encode and compare target gene clusters to known gene clusters. To verify the relation between the BGCs and natural products, the target BGCs can be expressed by suitable host through the use of molecular cloning.

== Databases and tools ==
Genetic data has been accumulated in databases. Researchers are able to utilize algorithms to decipher the data accessible from databases for the discovery of new processes, targets, and products. The following are databases and tools:

- GenBank database provides genomic datasets for analysis.
- UCSC Genome Browser
- AntiSMASH-DB allows comparing the sequences of newly sequenced BGCs against those of previously predicted and experimentally characterized ones.
- BIG-FAM is a biosynthetic gene cluster family database.
- DoBISCUIT is a database of secondary metabolite biosynthetic gene clusters.
- MIBiG (Minimum Information about a Biosynthetic Gene cluster specification) provides a standard for annotations and metadata on biosynthetic gene clusters and their molecular products.
- Interactive tree of life (iTOL) is a web-based tool for the display, manipulation and annotation of phylogenetic trees.
