= Uvaricin =

(+)-Uvaricin

Names
- Preferred IUPAC name (1S)-1-[(2R,2′R,5R,5′R)-5′-{(1R)-1-Hydroxy-13-[(5S)-5-methyl-2-oxo-2,5-dihydrofuran-3-yl]tridecyl}[2,2′-bioxolan]-5-yl]undecyl acetate

Identifiers
CAS Number	82064-83-3
3D model (JSmol)	Interactive image
ChEMBL	ChEMBL504329
ChemSpider	390275
KEGG	C08572
PubChem CID	441645
UNII	YGW6MN47BB
CompTox Dashboard (EPA)	DTXSID401002455
- InChI: InChI=1S/C39H68O7/c1-4-5-6-7-8-15-18-21-24-35(44-31(3)40)36-27-28-38(46-36)37-26-25-34(45-37)33(41)23-20-17-14-12-10-9-11-13-16-19-22-32-29-30(2)43-39(32)42/h29-30,33-38,41H,4-28H2,1-3H3/t30-,33+,34+,35-,36+,37+,38+/m0/s1 Key: JQOYPOSGHDJFLI-AVNCTIOFSA-N
- SMILES: O=C\1O[C@H](/C=C/1CCCCCCCCCCCC[C@@H](O)[C@@H]3O[C@@H]([C@@H]2O[C@H](CC2)[C@@H](OC(=O)C)CCCCCCCCCC)CC3)C

Properties
Chemical formula	C_{39}H_{68}O_{7}
Molar mass	648.966 g·mol^{−1}
- Except where otherwise noted, data are given for materials in their standard state (at 25 °C [77 °F], 100 kPa). verify (what is ?) Infobox references

Uvaricin is a bis(tetrahydrofuranoid) fatty acid lactone that was first isolated in 1982 from the roots of the Annonaceae Uvaria acuminata. Uvaricin was the first known example in a class of compounds known as acetogenins. Acetogenins, which are found in plants of the family Annonaceae, seem to kill cells by inhibiting NADH dehydrogenase in the mitochondrion. A method to synthesize uvaricin was first published in 1998, and an improved stereoselective synthesis published in 2001.
