= Resistomycin =

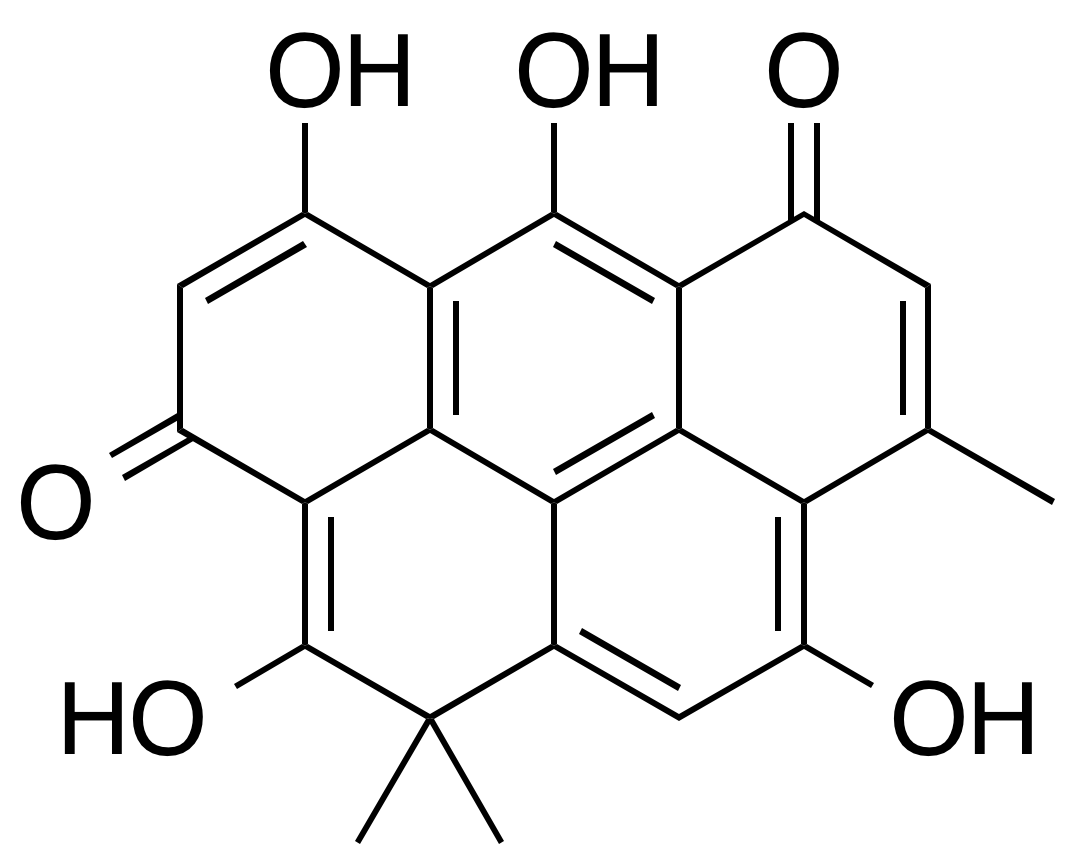

Names
- IUPAC name 6,10,14,19-Tetrahydroxy-4,9,9-trimethylpentacyclo[13.3.1.05,18.08,17.011,16]nonadeca-1(19),3,5,7,10,13,15,17-octaene-2,12-dione
- Other names: Heliomycin; Geliomycin; Itamycin; 3,5,7,10-tetrahydroxy-1,1,9-trimethyl-2H-Benzo[cf]pyrene-2,6(1H)-dione; 3,5,7,10-tetrahydroxy-1,1,9-trimethyl-2H-Benzo[cd]pyrene-2,6(1H)-dione; 3,5,7,10-Tetrahydroxy-1,1,9-trimethyl-2H-benzo[cf]pyrene-2,6(1H)-dione; 3,5,7,10-Tetrahydroxy-1,1,9-trimethyl-1H-benzo[cd]pyrene-2,6-dione

Identifiers
| CAS Number | 20004-62-0 |
| 3D model (JSmol) | Interactive image |
| ChEBI | CHEBI:29671 |
| ChEMBL | ChEMBL1320139 |
| ChemSpider | 78436128 |
| KEGG | C12080 |
| PubChem CID | 135430323 |
| UNII | 7N3A092A5X |
| CompTox Dashboard (EPA) | DTXSID4046101 |
- InChI: InChI=1S/C22H16O6/c1-7-4-9(23)15-18-13(7)10(24)5-8-14(18)19-16(20(15)27)11(25)6-12(26)17(19)21(28)22(8,2)3/h4-6,24-25,27-28H,1-3H3 Key: MJKDGCARCYPVQG-UHFFFAOYSA-N
- SMILES: CC1(C)C2=C3C=4C(C(=O)C=5C3=C(C(O)=C2)C(C)=CC5O)=C(O)C=C(O)C4C1=O

Properties
| Chemical formula | C_{22}H_{16}O_{6} |
| Molar mass | 376.364 g·mol^{−1} |
| Boiling point | 315°C |
- Except where otherwise noted, data are given for materials in their standard state (at 25 °C [77 °F], 100 kPa). Infobox references

Resistomycin is an antibiotic with the molecular formula C_{22}H_{16}O_{6}. Resistomycin is similar to hypericin. Resistomycin was first isolated in 1951 from the bacterium Streptomyces resistomycificus.
