= Anthracimycin =

Polyketide

Clinical data
- ATC code: none

Identifiers
- CAS Number: 1452849-94-3
- PubChem CID: 102496082
- ChemSpider: 29272409
- ChEBI: CHEBI:198294

Chemical and physical data
- Formula: C_{25}H_{32}O_{4}
- Molar mass: 396.527 g·mol^{−1}
- 3D model (JSmol): Interactive image
- SMILES: C[C@@H]1/C=C\C=C\[C@H](OC(=O)[C@@H](C(=O)/C=C(/[C@H]2[C@@H]1C=C[C@@H]3[C@@H]2CC=C(C3)C)\O)C)C
- InChI: InChI=1S/C25H32O4/c1-15-9-11-21-19(13-15)10-12-20-16(2)7-5-6-8-17(3)29-25(28)18(4)22(26)14-23(27)24(20)21/h5-10,12,14,16-21,24,27H,11,13H2,1-4H3/b7-5-,8-6+,23-14-/t16-,17-,18-,19+,20-,21+,24+/m1/s1; Key:MHXKMAAKEHGISP-MROKOONJSA-N

Anthracimycin is a polyketide antibiotic discovered in 2013. Anthracimycin is derived from marine actinobacteria. In preliminary laboratory research, it has shown activity against Bacillus anthracis, the bacteria that causes anthrax, and against methicillin-resistant Staphylococcus aureus (MRSA).

== Discovery of anthracimycin ==
Anthracimycin was first isolated from a species of marine Streptomyces (strain CNH365) which was collected off the shore of Santa Barbara, CA. Another strain of Streptomyces (strain T676) isolated off the coast of St. John's Island, Singapore, was found to also produce anthracimycin. This strain was found to contain the biosynthetic gene cluster for anthracimycin production.

== Biosynthesis ==
Anthracimycin is the product of a type I polyketide synthase (PKS). This modular synthetic pathway uses a trans-acyltransferase (AT) domain to load successive units of malonyl-CoA (MCoA) and methylmalonyl-CoA (MMCoA) to build the macrolide backbone. The synthesis is composed of 10 biosynthetic modules consisting of the typical domains associated with PKS biosynthetic pathways (See Figure 1). Formation of the decalin ring is part of the PKS pathway and not a post-tailoring event. This occurs via a spontaneous [4+2] cycloaddition after module 8 (See Figure 2). Cyclization to form the larger lactone ring is the final step of the process by the thioesterase domain.

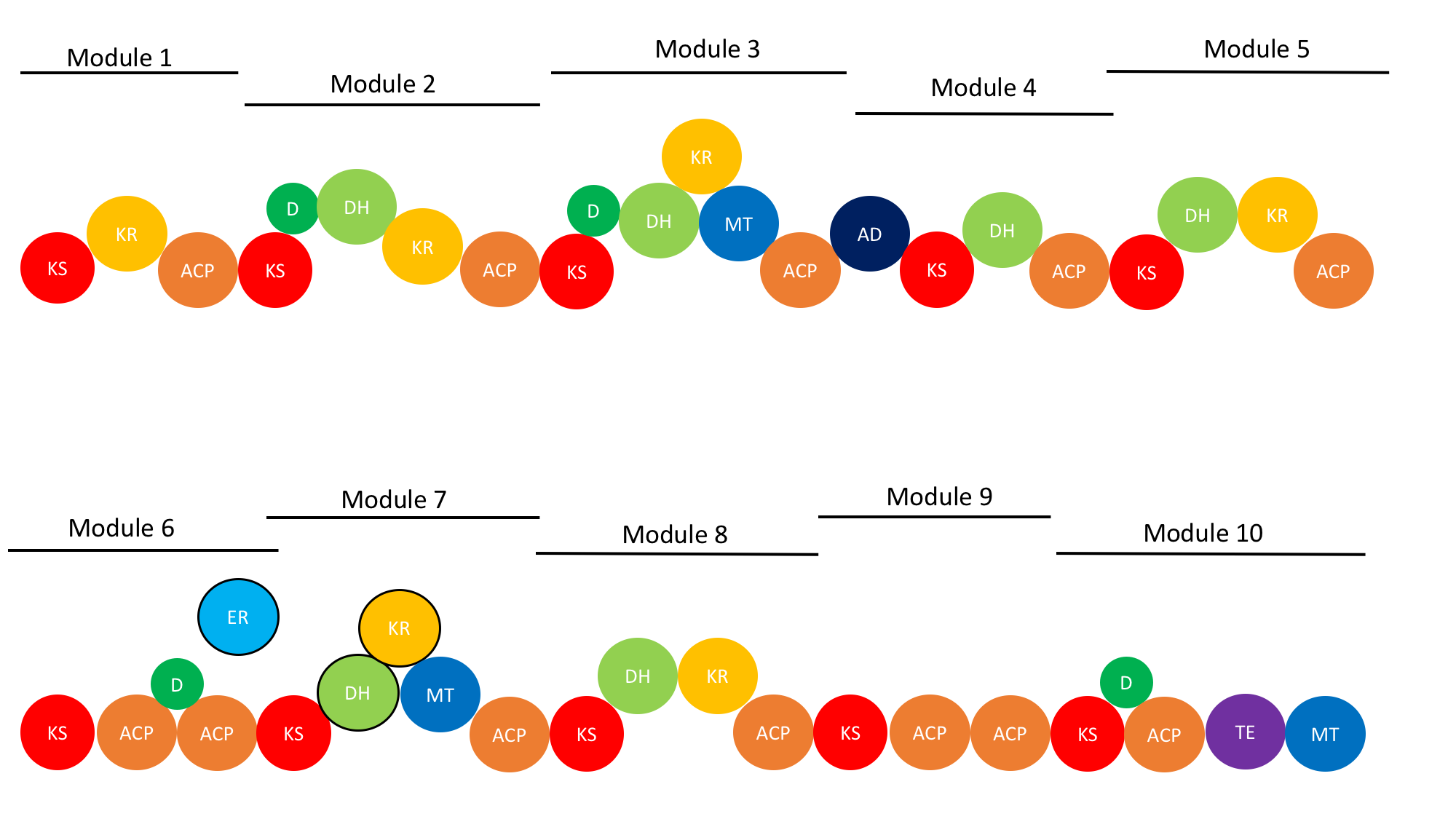
Figure 1. Architecture of the anthracimycin type I PKS system. Outlined domains are used iteratively. ACP- acyl carrier protein, AD- alcohol dehydrogenase, AT- acyltransferase, D- docking domain, DH- dehydratase, KS- ketoacyl synthase, KR- ketoreductase, MT- methyltransferase, ER- enoylreductase, TE- thioesterase.

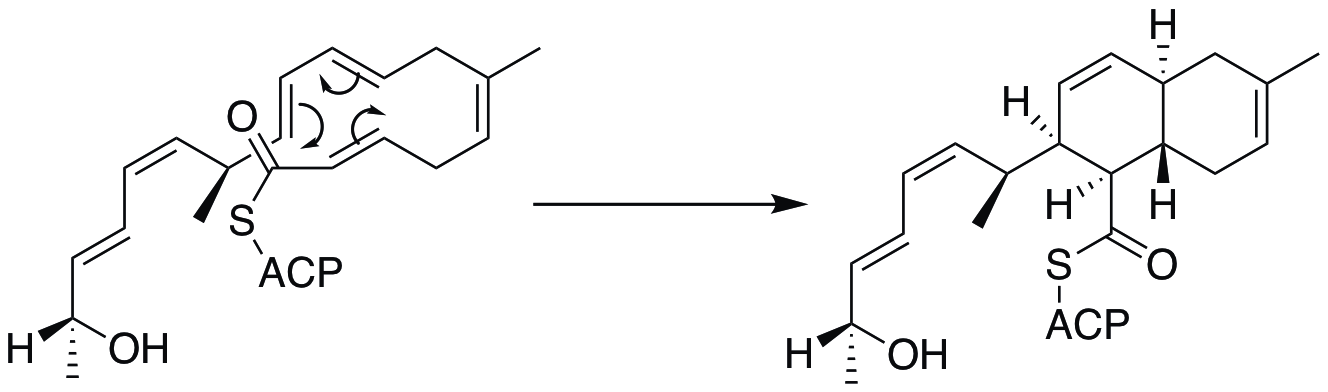
Figure 2. Formation of the decalin ring by [4+2] cycloaddition.

== Antibiotic activity ==
Anthracimycin was first noted for its potent activity against Bacillus anthracis (strain UM23C1-1), which is known to cause the human infectious disease anthrax, with a minimum inhibitory concentration (MIC) of 0.031 ug/mL. It was also initially found to have activity against other Gram-positive genera such as staphylococci, enterococci, and streptococci, but was not active against Gram-negative strains. In a follow-up study, anthracimycin was screened against a panel of Staphylococcus aureus strains both in vivo and in vitro. All strains of S. aureus tested were susceptible to anthracimycin at MIC values of less than or equal to 0.25 mg/L. This included strains of methicillin-susceptible, methicillin-resistant (MRSA), and vancomycin-resistant strains. Unfortunately, postantibiotic effects were minimal and the effects of the antibiotic were mitigated by presence of 20% human serum. Nevertheless, levels of anthracimycin significantly below the MIC were still able to slow MRSA growth. The compound was found to be minimally toxic to human cells with an IC50 of 70 mg/L against human carcinoma cells. It has been found that the most likely mechanism of action for anthracimycin is inhibition of RNA and DNA synthesis, but not through DNA intercalation. As part of an in vivo study with a murine peritonitis model of infection, anthracimycin was found to protect mice against mortality by MRSA at doses of 1 and 10 mg/kg.
