= Annonacin =

Names
- Preferred IUPAC name (5S)-5-Methyl-3-[(2R,8R,13R)-2,8,13-trihydroxy-13-{(2R,5R)-5-[(1R)-1-hydroxytridecyl]oxolan-2-yl}tridecyl]furan-2(5H)-one

Identifiers
CAS Number	111035-65-5
3D model (JSmol)	Interactive image; Interactive image
ChEMBL	ChEMBL476498
ChemSpider	314587
PubChem CID	354398
UNII	40372ET6TM
CompTox Dashboard (EPA)	DTXSID20892989
- InChI: InChI=1S/C35H64O7/c1-3-4-5-6-7-8-9-10-11-15-21-31(38)33-23-24-34(42-33)32(39)22-17-16-19-29(36)18-13-12-14-20-30(37)26-28-25-27(2)41-35(28)40/h25,27,29-34,36-39H,3-24,26H2,1-2H3/t27-,29+,30+,31+,32+,33+,34+/m0/s1 Key: XNODZYPOIPVPRF-CGWDHHCXSA-N; InChI=1/C35H64O7/c1-3-4-5-6-7-8-9-10-11-15-21-31(38)33-23-24-34(42-33)32(39)22-17-16-19-29(36)18-13-12-14-20-30(37)26-28-25-27(2)41-35(28)40/h25,27,29-34,36-39H,3-24,26H2,1-2H3/t27-,29+,30+,31+,32+,33+,34+/m0/s1 Key: XNODZYPOIPVPRF-CGWDHHCXBQ
- SMILES: CCCCCCCCCCCCC(C1CCC(O1)C(CCCCC(CCCCCC(CC2=CC(OC2=O)C)O)O)O)O; O=C\1O[C@H](/C=C/1C[C@H](O)CCCCC[C@@H](O)CCCC[C@@H](O)[C@@H]2O[C@@H]([C@H](O)CCCCCCCCCCCC)CC2)C

Properties
Chemical formula	C_{35}H_{64}O_{7}
Molar mass	596.890 g·mol^{−1}
- Except where otherwise noted, data are given for materials in their standard state (at 25 °C [77 °F], 100 kPa). verify (what is ?) Infobox references

Annonacin is a chemical compound with neurotoxic effects in vitro. It is found in some fruits, such as the paw paw, custard apples, soursop, and others from the family Annonaceae. It is a member of the class of compounds known as acetogenins.

== Traditional medicine ==
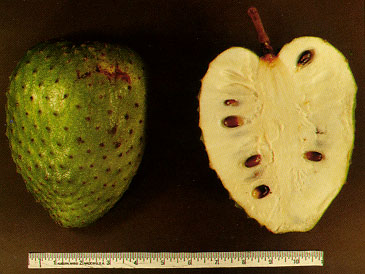
Soursop fruit, a source of annonacin

Historically, plants and fruits of Annonaceae (particularly Annona muricata and Annona squamosa) have been consumed in various forms throughout the Caribbean, usually as hot water extracts of leaves. These annonacin-containing herbal teas are thought to be useful in folk medicine. On the Caribbean island of Guadeloupe, such teas are consumed mainly for their sedative qualities. Use of annonacin products in Guadeloupe often lasts from early childhood through old age, and daily consumption is not uncommon.

It was discovered in Guadeloupe that atypical Parkinsonism was predominant in elderly males, who regularly consume annonacin-containing herbal teas. Of 87 people with Parkinsonism transferred to one clinic between 1996 and 1998, 25% had Parkinson's, while 36% had progressive supranuclear palsy and 39% had atypical Parkinsonism.

== Neurotoxicity ==
Annonacin is a disabling and potentially lethal neurotoxin. Like other acetogenins, it is a mitochondrial complex I (NADH-dehydrogenase) inhibitor, as determined in vitro. As NADH-dehydrogenase is responsible for the conversion of NADH to NAD+ as well as the establishment of a proton gradient in the mitochondria, annonacin disables the ability of a cell to generate ATP through oxidative phosphorylation, leading to apoptosis.

In vitro, the LC_{50} of annonacin is 0.018 μM to dopaminergic neurons, and by experimental interpretation, damage to these neurons appears to cause the neurodegenerative effects of the toxin. Annonacin is 100 times more toxic than 1-methyl-4-phenylpyridinium (MPP+), another potent mitochondrial complex I inhibitor. Compared to MPP+, annonacin produces a wider and more dramatic loss of neurons, not only in the nigro-striatal system, but in the basal ganglia and brainstem nuclei as well.

Annonacin has been linked to the abnormally high incidence of progressive supranuclear palsy and atypical Parkinsonism in the Caribbean island of Guadeloupe where consumption of fruits, such as the soursop (Annona muricata), is common. An average-sized soursop fruit contains 15 mg of annonacin.
