= Bullatacin =

(+)-Bullatacin

Names
- Other names Annonareticin; Rolliniastatin 2; Squamocin G

Identifiers
CAS Number	123123-32-0 =
3D model (JSmol)	Interactive image
ChemSpider	9300122
PubChem CID	114749
CompTox Dashboard (EPA)	DTXSID501030029
- InChI: InChI=1S/C37H66O7/c1-3-4-5-6-7-11-14-17-20-31(39)33-22-24-35(43-33)36-25-23-34(44-36)32(40)21-18-15-12-9-8-10-13-16-19-30(38)27-29-26-28(2)42-37(29)41/h26,28,30-36,38-40H,3-25,27H2,1-2H3/t28-,30+,31-,32+,33+,34+,35+,36+/m0/s1 Key: MBABCNBNDNGODA-LUVUIASKSA-N; InChI=1/C37H66O7/c1-3-4-5-6-7-11-14-17-20-31(39)33-22-24-35(43-33)36-25-23-34(44-36)32(40)21-18-15-12-9-8-10-13-16-19-30(38)27-29-26-28(2)42-37(29)41/h26,28,30-36,38-40H,3-25,27H2,1-2H3/t28-,30+,31-,32+,33+,34+,35+,36+/m0/s1 Key: MBABCNBNDNGODA-LUVUIASKBE
- SMILES: O=C\1O[C@H](/C=C/1C[C@H](O)CCCCCCCCCC[C@@H](O)[C@@H]3O[C@@H]([C@@H]2O[C@H](CC2)[C@@H](O)CCCCCCCCCC)CC3)C

Properties
Chemical formula	C_{37}H_{66}O_{7}
Molar mass	622.928 g·mol^{−1}
- Except where otherwise noted, data are given for materials in their standard state (at 25 °C [77 °F], 100 kPa). (what is ?) Infobox references

Bullatacin is a bis(tetrahydrofuranoid) fatty acid lactone found in some fruits from Annonaceae family. It is a member of the class of compounds known as acetogenins.
