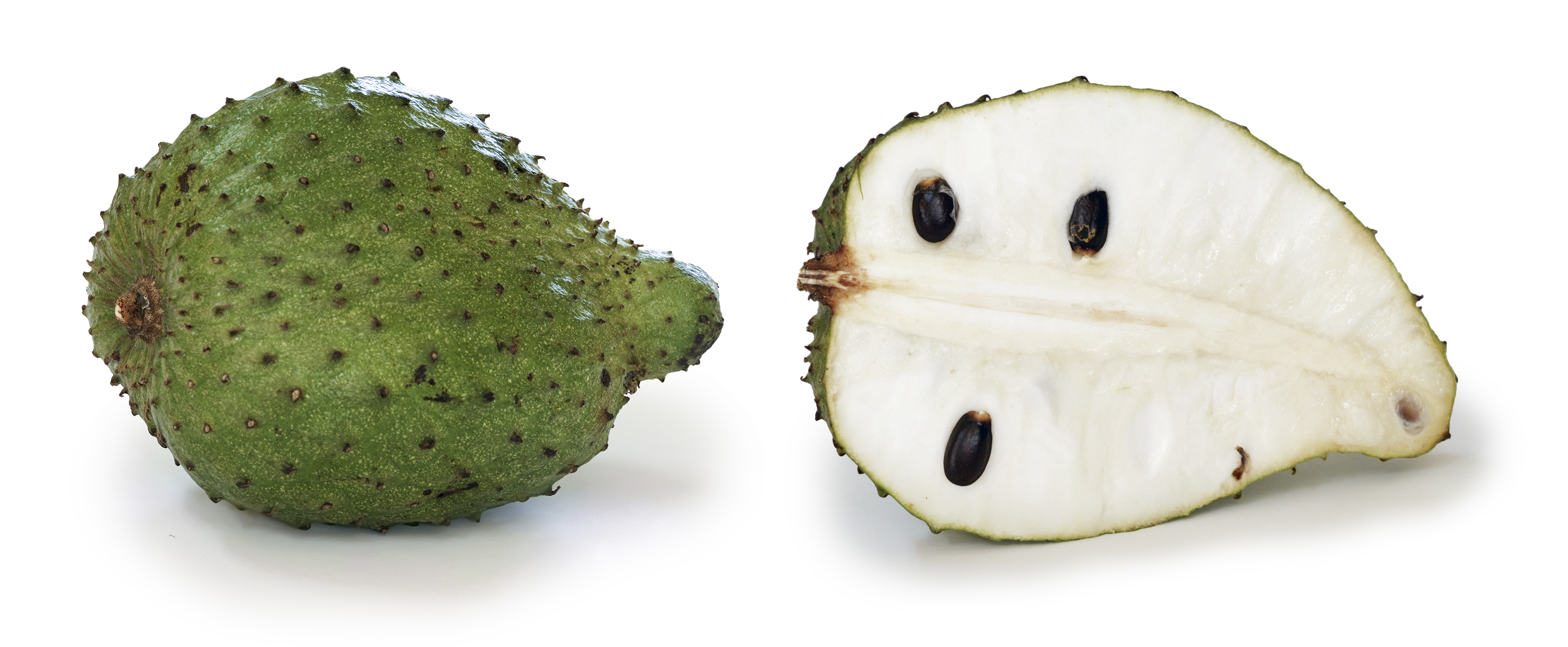

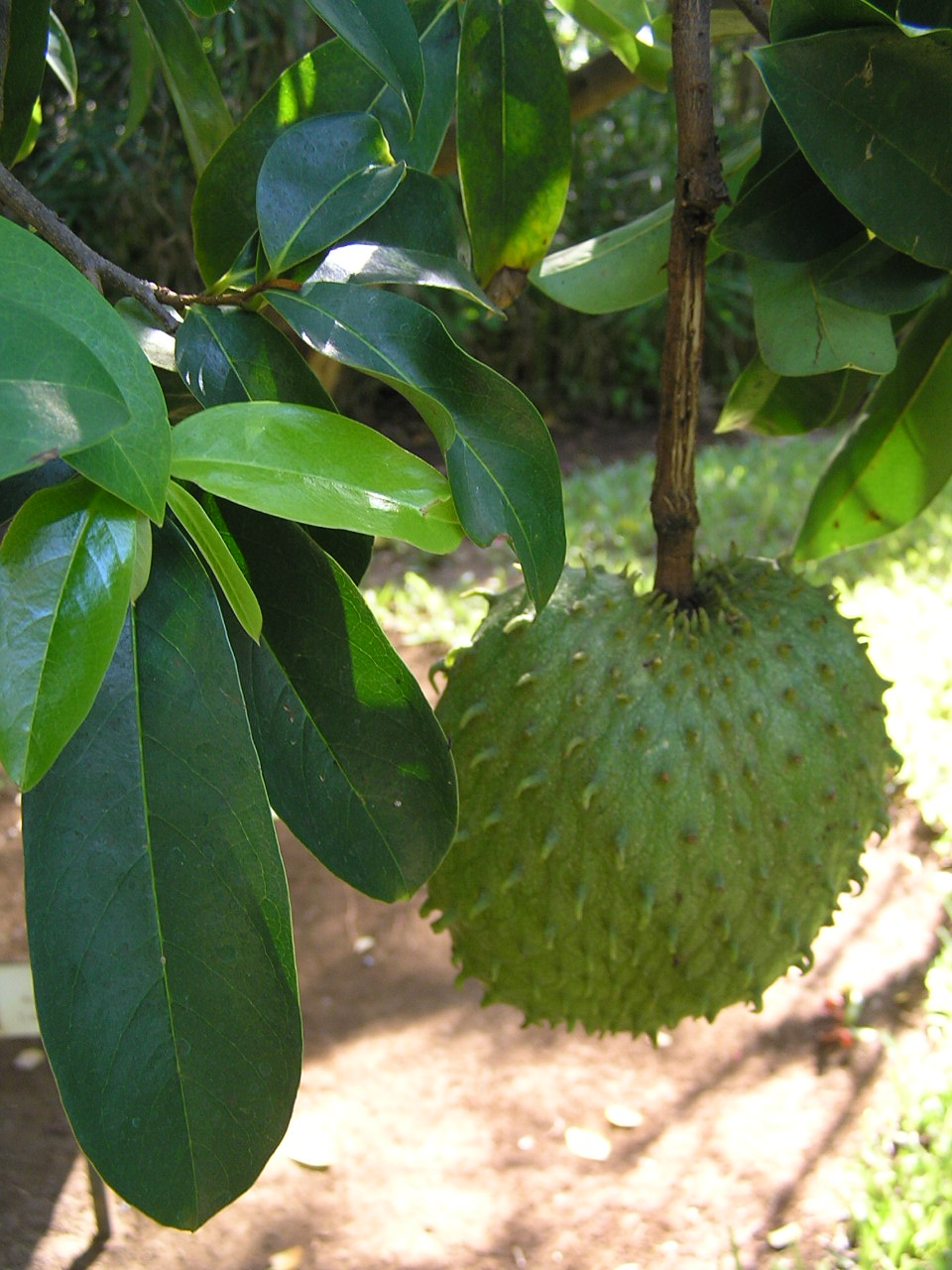
- Soursop fruit on its tree

Conservation status
- Least Concern (IUCN 3.1)

Scientific classification
- Kingdom: Plantae
- Clade: Embryophytes
- Clade: Tracheophytes
- Clade: Angiosperms
- Clade: Magnoliids
- Order: Magnoliales
- Family: Annonaceae
- Genus: Annona
- Species: A. muricata

Binomial name
- Annona muricata L.

Synonyms
- Annona bonplandiana Kunth; Annona cearaensis Barb.Rodr.; Annona muricata var. borinquensis Morales; Annona muricata f. mirabilis R.E.Fr.

= Soursop =

Tropical fruit tree

Soursop (also called graviola, guyabano, and in Hispanic America guanábana) is the fruit of Annona muricata, a broadleaf, flowering, evergreen tree. It is native to the tropical Americas and is widely propagated. It is in the same genus, Annona, as cherimoya and is in the Annonaceae family.

The soursop is adapted to areas of high humidity and relatively warm winters; temperatures below 5 °C (41 °F) will cause damage to leaves and small branches, and temperatures below 3 °C (37 °F) can be fatal. The fruit becomes dry and is no longer good for concentrate.

With an aroma similar to pineapple, the flavor of the fruit has been described as a combination of strawberries and apple with sour citrus flavor notes, contrasting with an underlying thick creamy texture reminiscent of banana.

Soursop is widely promoted (sometimes as graviola) as an alternative cancer treatment, but there is not enough reliable medical evidence that it is effective for treating cancer or any disease.

Soursop leaves, skin, flesh, and seeds contain annonacin, a compound under preliminary research for its potential neurotoxicity.

== Annona muricata ==
Annona muricata is a species of the genus Annona of the custard apple tree family, Annonaceae, which has edible fruit. The fruit is usually called soursop due to its slightly acidic taste when ripe. Annona muricata is native to Mexico and Central America but is now widely cultivated – and in some areas, becoming invasive – in tropical and subtropical climates throughout the world, such as India.

== Botanical description ==
Annona muricata is a small, upright, evergreen tree that can grow to about 10 m (33 ft) tall.

Its young branches are hairy. The leaves are oblong to oval, 8 to 16 cm (3.1 to 6.3 in) long and 3 to 7 cm (1.2 to 2.8 in) wide. They are a glossy dark green with no hairs above, and paler and minutely hairy to no hairs below. The leaf stalks are 4 to 13 mm (0.16 to 0.51 in) long and without hairs.

Flower stalks (peduncles) are 2 to 5 mm (0.079 to 0.197 in) long and woody. They appear opposite from the leaves or as an extra from near the leaf stalk, each with one or two flowers, occasionally a third. Stalks for the individual flowers (pedicels) are stout and woody, minutely hairy to hairless and 15 to 20 mm (0.59 to 0.79 in) with small bractlets nearer to the base which are densely hairy.

The petals are thick and yellowish. Outer petals meet at the edges without overlapping and are broadly ovate, 2.8 to 3.3 cm (1.1 to 1.3 in) by 2.1 to 2.5 cm (0.83 to 0.98 in), tapering to a point with a heart shaped base. They are evenly thick, and are covered with long, slender, soft hairs externally and matted finely with soft hairs within. Inner petals are oval shaped and overlap. They measure roughly 2.5 to 2.8 cm (0.98 to 1.10 in) by 2 cm (0.79 in), and are sharply angled and tapering at the base. Margins are comparatively thin, with fine matted soft hairs on both sides. The receptacle is conical and hairy. The stamens are 4.5 mm (0.18 in) long and narrowly wedge-shaped. The connective-tip terminate abruptly and anther hollows are unequal. Sepals are quite thick and do not overlap. Carpels are linear and basally growing from one base. The ovaries are covered with dense reddish brown hairs, 1-ovuled, style short and stigma truncate. Its pollen is shed as permanent tetrads.

The fruit is oval, dark green when immature, with a leathery, inedible skin that turns yellow-green during maturity. They grow to 10–35 cm (3.9–13.8 in) long, with a moderately firm texture, and typically weigh around 4 kg (8.8 lb), up to a maximum of 10 kg (22 lb). Their flesh is juicy, acidic, whitish, and aromatic somewhat like pineapple, although with a unique earthy aroma. Most of the immature segments are seedless, whereas mature fruit may contain as many as 200 seeds.

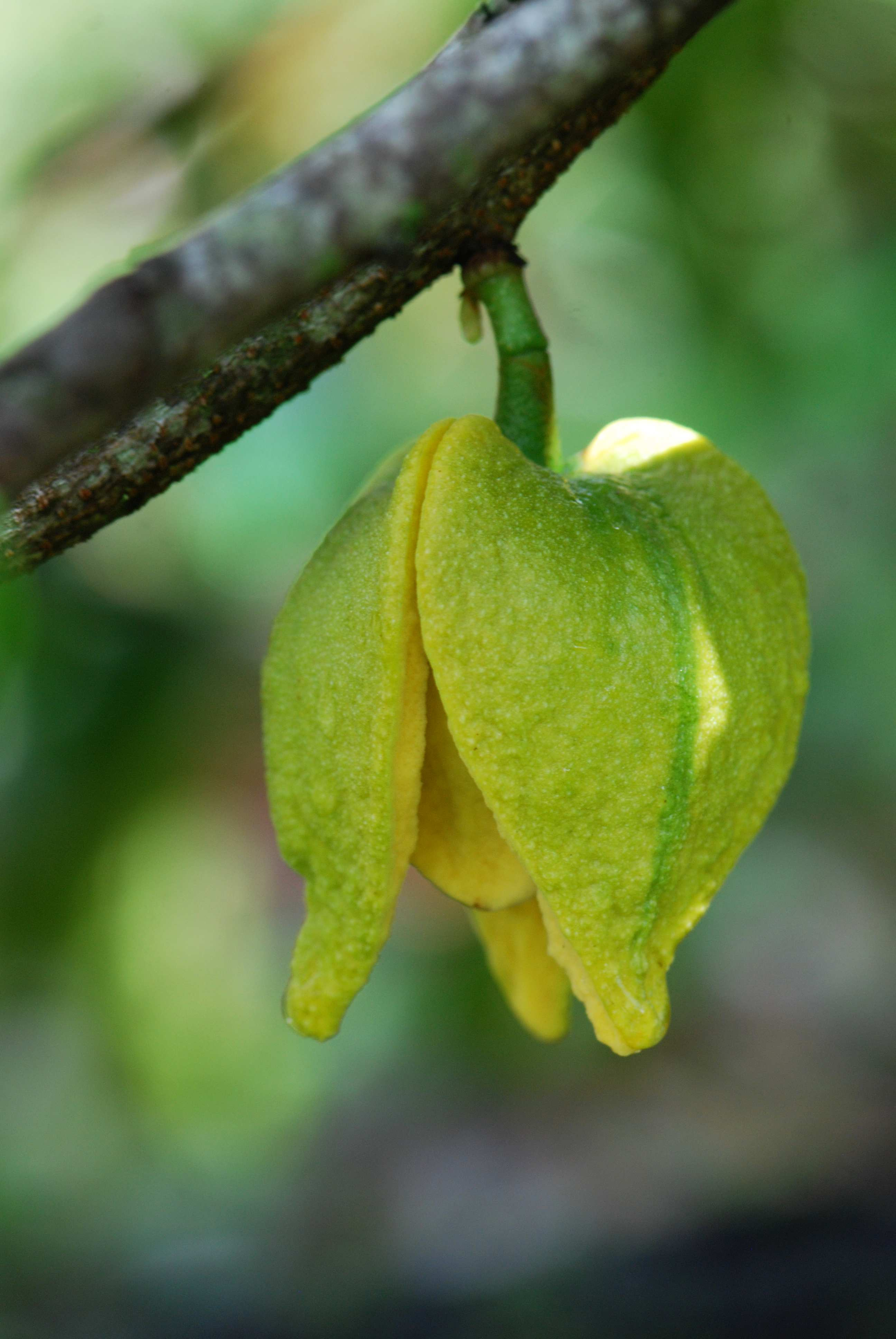
Flower

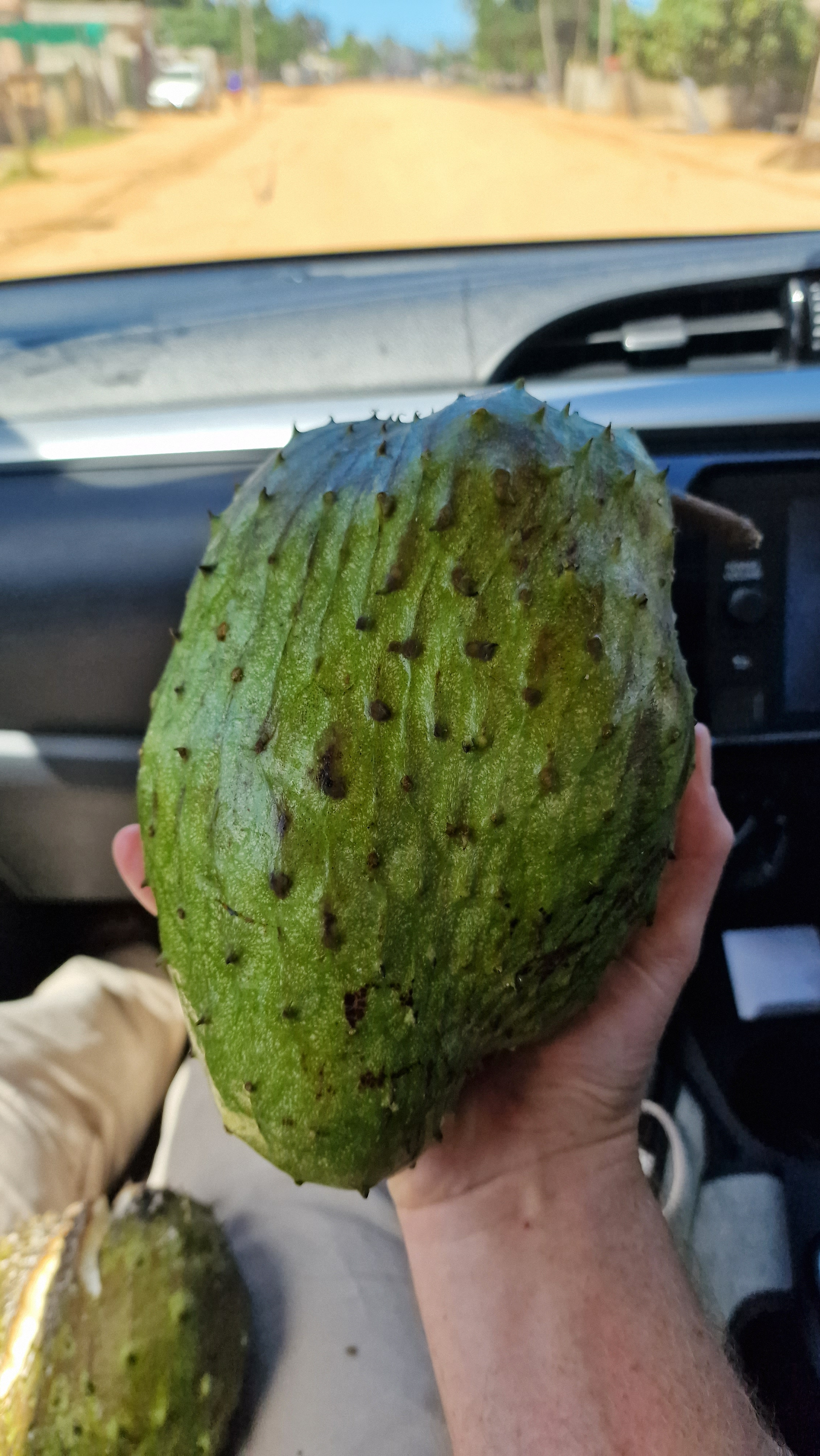
Fruit

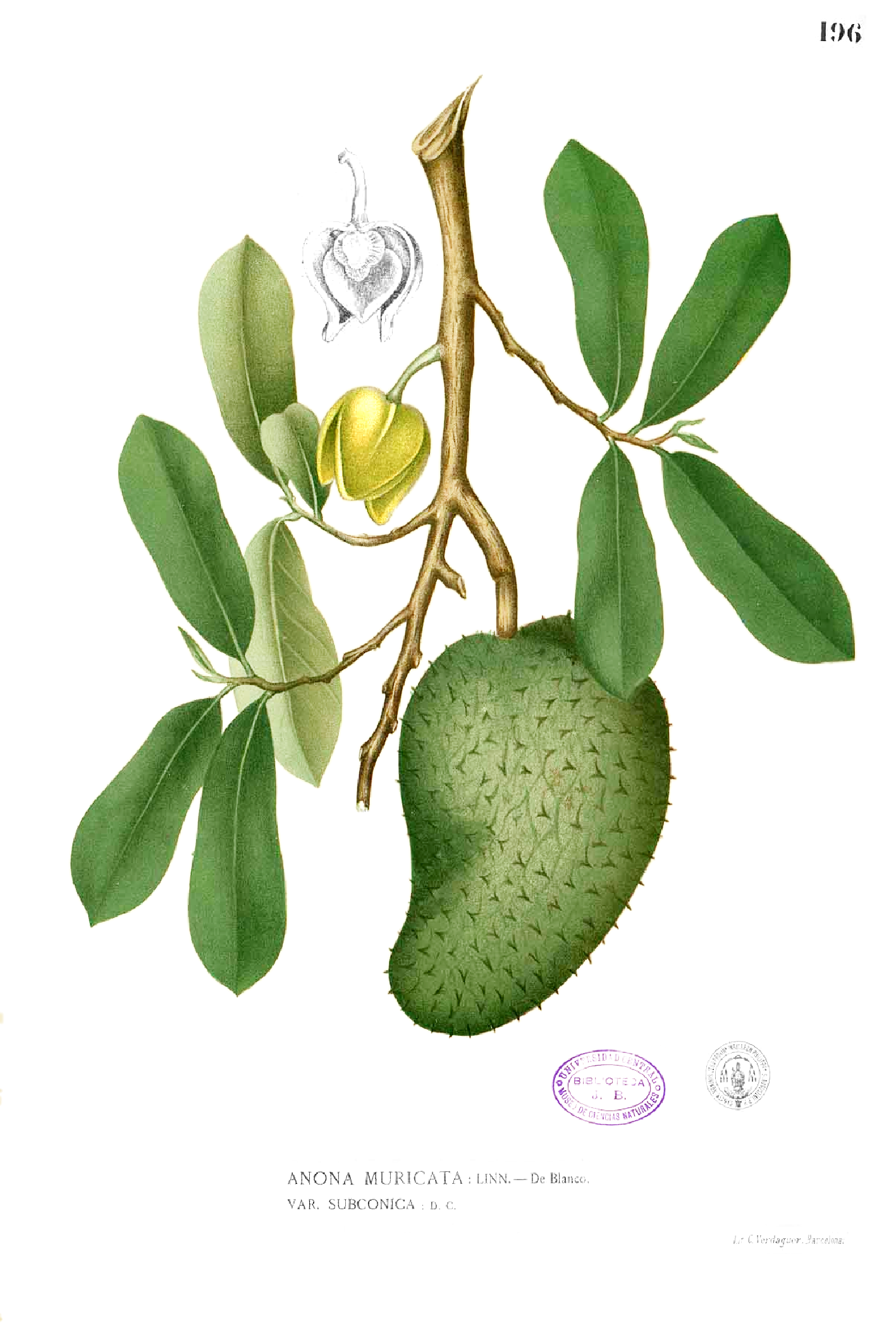
Botanical drawing showing flower, leaves, and fruit

== Distribution ==
Annona muricata is tolerant of poor soil and prefers lowland areas between the altitudes of 0 to 1,200 m (3,900 ft). The exact origin is unknown; it is native to the tropical regions of the continental Americas and is widely propagated. It is an introduced species on all temperate continents, especially in subtropical regions.

== Cultivation ==
The plant is grown for its 10–35 cm (3.9–13.8 in) long, prickly, green fruit, which can weigh up to 10 kg (22 lb), making it the largest Annona fruit, though not as large as the related junglesop Anonidium mannii. Away from its native area, some limited production occurs as far north as southern Florida within USDA Zone 10; however, these are mostly garden plantings for local consumption. It is also grown in parts of China and Southeast Asia and is abundant on the Island of Mauritius. The main suppliers of the fruit are Mexico followed by Peru, Brazil, Ecuador, Guatemala, and Haiti. To aid soursop breeders and stimulate further development of genomic resources for this globally important plant family, the complete genome for Annona muricata was sequenced in 2021.

== Uses ==
=== Culinary ===
The flesh of the fruit consists of an edible, white pulp, some fiber, and a core of indigestible black seeds. The pulp is also used to make fruit nectar, smoothies, fruit juice drinks, as well as candies, sorbets, and ice cream flavorings.

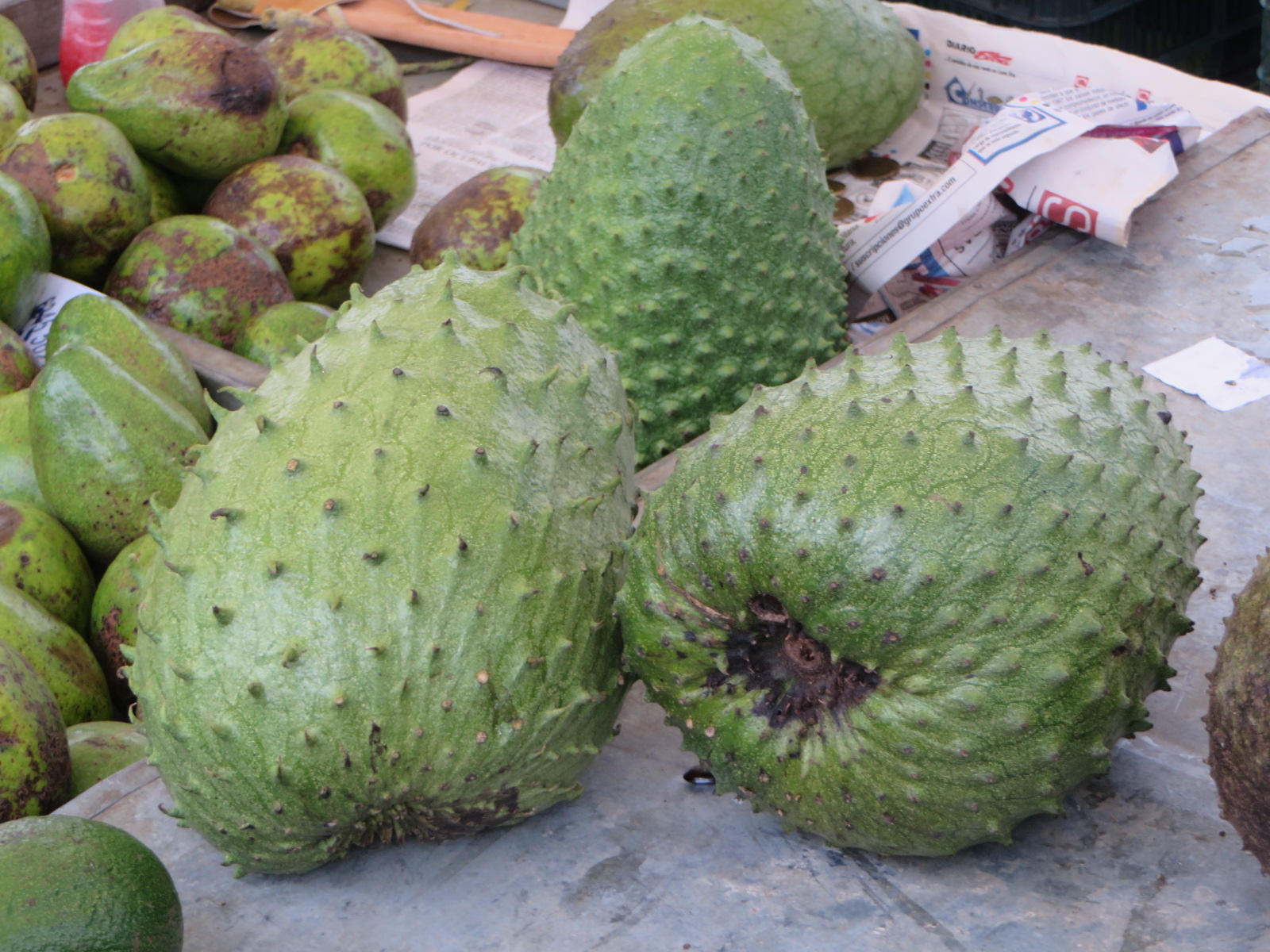
On sale in Costa Rica

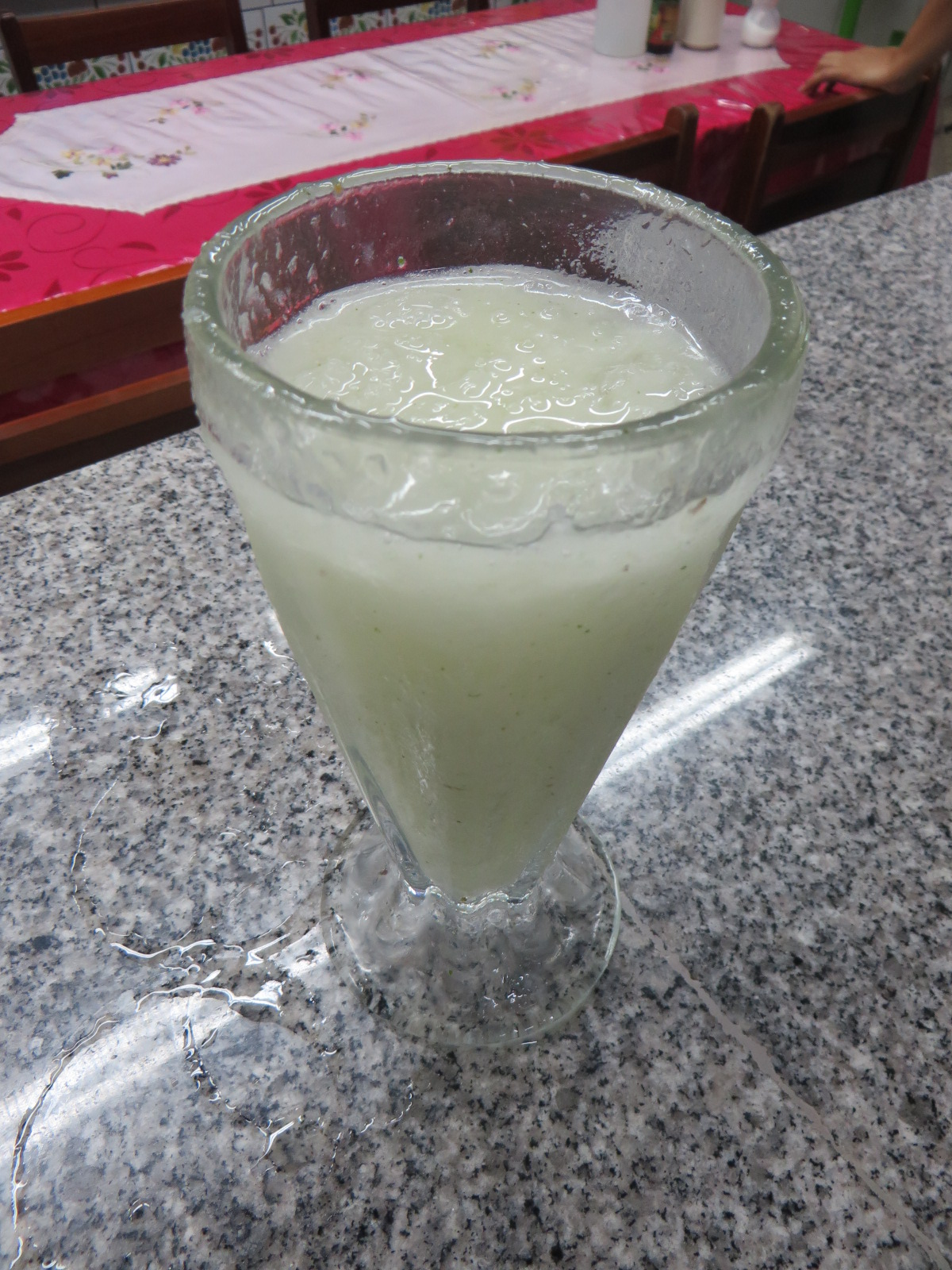
Juice at a restaurant in Costa Rica

== Nutrition ==
Soursop, raw
Nutritional value per 100 g (3.5 oz)
- Energy: 276 kJ (66 kcal)
- Carbohydrates: 16.84 g
- Sugars: 13.54 g
- Dietary fiber: 3.3 g
- Fat: 0.3 g
- Protein: 1 g
Vitamins and minerals
Vitamins	Quantity %DV^{†}
Thiamine (B1)	6% 0.07 mg
Riboflavin (B2)	4% 0.05 mg
Niacin (B3)	6% 0.9 mg
Pantothenic acid (B5)	5% 0.253 mg
Vitamin B6	3% 0.059 mg
Folate (B9)	4% 14 μg
Choline	1% 7.6 mg
Vitamin C	23% 20.6 mg
Minerals	Quantity %DV^{†}
Calcium	1% 14 mg
Iron	3% 0.6 mg
Magnesium	5% 21 mg
Phosphorus	2% 27 mg
Potassium	9% 278 mg
Sodium	1% 14 mg
Zinc	1% 0.1 mg
- Other constituents: Quantity
- Water: 81 g
- Link to USDA Database entry
- ^{†}Percentages estimated using US recommendations for adults, except for potassium, which is estimated based on expert recommendation from the National Academies.

Raw soursop is 81% water, 17% carbohydrates, 1% protein, and has negligible fat (see table). In a reference amount of 100 g (3.5 oz), the raw fruit supplies 276 kilojoules (66 kilocalories) of food energy, and contains only vitamin C as a significant amount (23%) of the Daily Value, with no other micronutrients in appreciable amounts (table).

== Phytochemicals ==
The neurotoxin annonacin is contained in the fruit, seeds, and leaves of soursop. The leaves of Annona muricata contain annonamine, which is an aporphine-class alkaloid containing a quaternary ammonium group. The plant also contains lichexanthone, a compound in the xanthone class.

=== Neurotoxicity ===
The Memorial Sloan-Kettering Cancer Center cautions, "alkaloids extracted from graviola may cause neuronal dysfunction". Annonacin has been shown in laboratory research to be neurotoxic. In 2010, the French food safety agency concluded that "it is not possible to confirm that the observed cases of atypical Parkinson syndrome ... are linked to the consumption of Annona muricata".

Annonacin, a neurotoxin found in soursop

=== Controversy ===
In 2008, the Federal Trade Commission in the United States stated that use of soursop to treat cancer was "bogus", and there was "no credible scientific evidence" that the extract of soursop sold by Bioque Technologies "can prevent, cure, or treat cancer of any kind." Also in 2008, a UK court case relating to the sale of Triamazon, a soursop product, resulted in the criminal conviction of a man under the terms of the UK Cancer Act for offering to treat people for cancer. A spokesman for the council that instigated the action stated, "it is as important now as it ever was that people are protected from those peddling unproven products with spurious claims as to their effects."

The Memorial Sloan-Kettering Cancer Center and Cancer Research UK state that cancer treatment using soursop is not supported by reliable clinical evidence. According to Cancer Research UK, "Many sites on the internet advertise and promote graviola capsules as a cancer cure, but none of them are supported by any reputable scientific cancer organizations" and "there is no evidence to show that graviola works as a cure for cancer".

== See also ==
- Annona crassiflora
- Annona reticulata
- Asimina triloba
- Atemoya
- Cherimoya
- List of unproven and disproven cancer treatments
- Sugar-apple
